= Water bath =

A water bath can refer to:

- A bain-marie or double boiler
- A heated bath
- A laboratory water bath
- A method of home canning
- Electrical water bath stunning

A steam bath can refer to:

- A steambath
- A play called Steambath

== See also ==
- Sous-vide, a cooking technique that uses a water bath
- Bathwater (disambiguation)
