= Laboratory bath =

A laboratory bath could refer to any of the following:

- Cooling bath: a laboratory device that lowers the temperature of the bath or improves heat conduction
- Heated bath: a laboratory device that raises the temperature of the bath to enhance a chemical reaction
- Laboratory water bath: a laboratory device that maintains the temperature of the bath
- Oil bath: a laboratory device that uses oil an oil to regulate the temperature of a sample
