= Centre de Recherche et d'Études pour l'Alimentation =

Centre de Recherche et d'Études pour l'Alimentation (The Culinary Research and Education Academy or CREA) is a culinary academy and food science think tank that provides training and consultation services for food industry professionals in the sous-vide cooking method, as well as other food-forward techniques. CREA was established in Paris in 1991 by Bruno Goussault and is the service arm of its parent company, Cuisine Solutions.

== History ==
Credited with developing modern sous-vide, Bruno Goussault’s work with low-temperature, under-vacuum cooking dates back to the 1970s, during which he conducted a study that demonstrated how cooking beef shoulder sous-vide extended its shelf life to 60 days.

Following a partnership with three-star chef Joël Robuchon in the 1980s to create a menu featuring sous-vide prepared foods for SNCF, Goussault received encouragement from Robuchon to open a sous-vide training center.

CREA opened its doors in Paris in 1991 to teach students the proper techniques and safety precautions necessary for sous-vide cooking. Since then, Goussault and his team of food engineers and culinary professionals have helped to train over 80% of chefs with three Michelin Guide stars, including Thomas Keller, Yannick Alléno, Anne-Sophie Pic, Guy Savoy, and Michel Bras.

== Courses & offerings ==
In addition to holding sous-vide courses at its Paris location, CREA has expanded to offer training sessions at its Test Kitchen in Sterling, Virginia, global seminars, and on-site customized instruction at food organizations around the world.

CREA also offers online courses on culinary techniques such as the sous-vide method, mixology, butchery, food safety, and food quality. Aside from its training classes, CREA provides full-service consultation to various stakeholders in the food industry, including menu engineering, quality assurance, food safety, food quality, kitchen design, facility development, labor reduction, operational excellence, and equipment procurement.
