= Thermal immersion circulator =

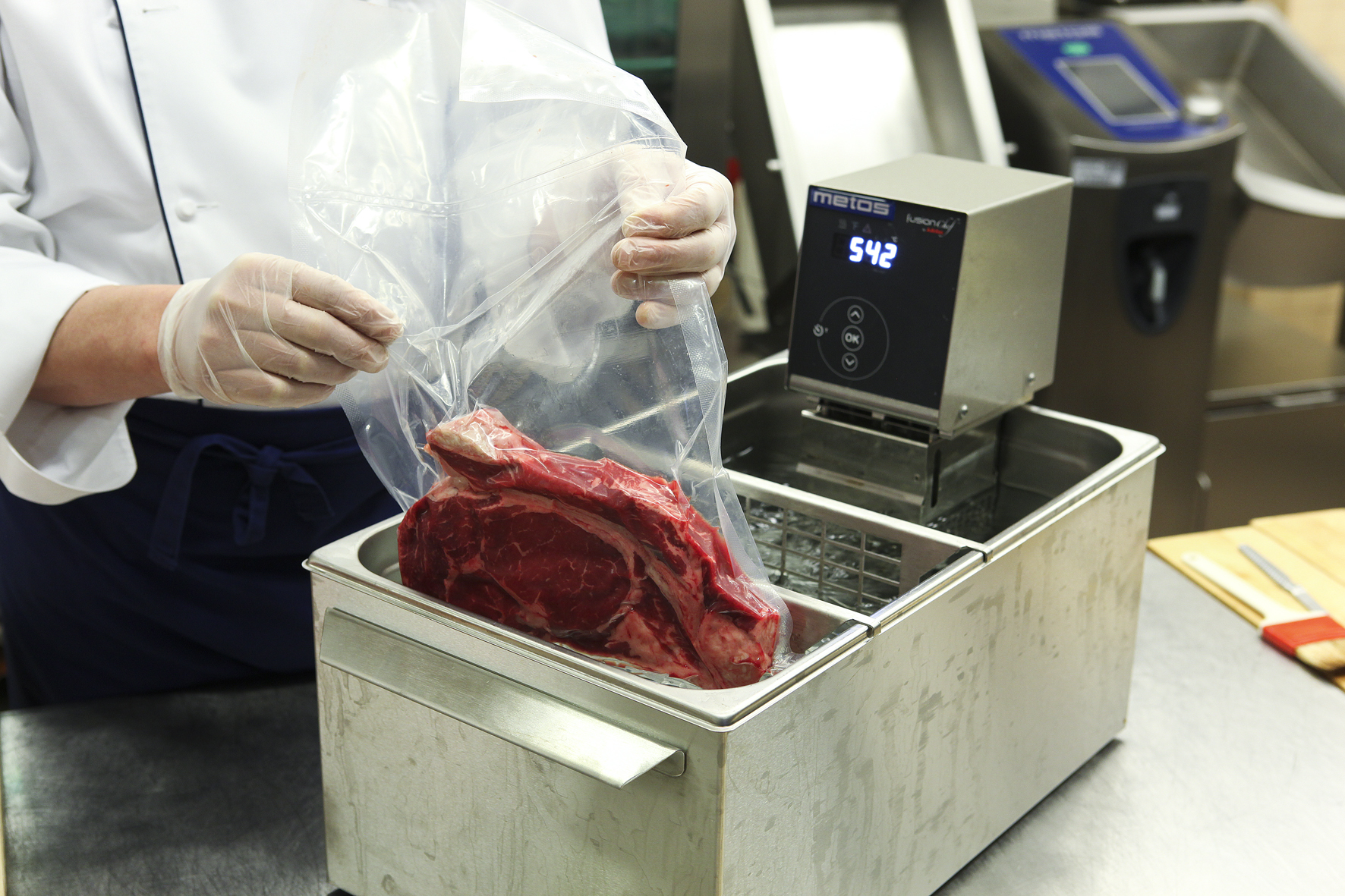
Thermal immersion circulator for meat

A thermal immersion circulator is an electrically powered device that circulates and heats a warm fluid kept at an accurate and stable temperature. It is used in process, environmental, microbiological, hazardous waste, and other laboratories. Since 2005 they have also been used for sous-vide food cooking, a method that uses airtight plastic bags in a water bath at accurately regulated temperatures much lower than usually used for cooking.

A thermal immersion circulator comprises a circulator pump or motorized impeller to move the fluid, a heating element immersed in the fluid, an accurate temperature probe, and control circuitry which compares the measured temperature with the desired value and supplies power to the heater as required to stabilize the temperature.

One of the laboratory brands, Huber, states in their user manuals that the laboratory circulators should not be used for food or medical uses. A food-grade, rather than laboratory, circulator is advised for culinary use, even if unused.

== See also ==
- Laboratory water bath
- Bain-marie
