= Rebatching (soapmaking) =

Soapmaking technique

Rebatching, or hand milling, is a soapmaking technique used by hobbyists and artisan soapmakers. The commercial equivalent is French milling.

In rebatching, commercially purchased or previously made soap (a soap base) is shredded or diced finely and mixed with a liquid, into which the soap shreds begin to dissolve. It is then heated at a fairly low temperature until the mass is more or less homogeneous. When it becomes translucent and reaches a thick, gel-like consistency, it is spooned or piped into molds and allowed to harden.

Soapmakers frequently use rebatching as a way of adding substances that could not withstand the high temperatures or caustic chemical environment of cold process or hot process soapmaking, such as certain essential oils (for example, those with a very low flash point). The choice of liquid affects the character of the finished soap; milk is frequently used to give the soap a smooth, creamy consistency. Rebatching can also be used as a way of salvaging soap that cracked, curdled or separated while being made.

As with the melt and pour process, rebatching does not necessarily involve saponification, and as such it is a misnomer to refer to it as soap-"making".
