= Melt and pour =

Soapmaking technique

Melt and Pour soap crafting is a process often used by soapmakers, both for large scale (commercial) and small scale (domestic, artisanal) manufacture. Small scale artisan soap makers find "melt and pour" production useful when trying out new product lines. The process differs from the cold process or hot process in utilising a pre-manufactured solid soap base which has already undergone saponification, so the soap maker does not need to handle caustic alkali, i.e. lye.

== Method ==
A commercially acquired "melt and pour" soap base is melted in a pan or commercial melting vessel, using direct heat, or in a water jacket melting pot, (large double boiler or "bain marie"), and re-solidifies as it cools. Domestically, a microwave oven can be used for melting small quantities of the base. Additions can be added at the still-hot liquid stage, such as herbal powders, fragrance, essential oils, moisturizing agents, colorants, or exfoliating agents, e.g. poppy seeds, coffee grounds or pumice, along with coloured micas, metallic glitter, honey and flower heads. The liquified concoction can be poured into individual molds, tray molds, or blocks. Molds are made of metal or, more commonly, from plastic or reinforced silicone rubber, allowing artisans to make their own molds using a two-part mold kit. Upon cooling, the soap can be removed from the molds as individual soaps, or as blocks for slicing into bars. Layers of different colors, or transparent layers, can be built up, or pre-cast embeddable soap shapes, called embeds, can be set into the soap during moulding to produce novel patterns. Melt and pour bases can be transparent or opaque, and are sometimes enriched with products like goat's milk or shea butter to add value. The small-scale process lends itself to bespoke manufacture; a single soap bar can be individually manufactured if desired.

== Other considerations ==
Some soapmakers prefer "melt and pour" because the process is simple and safe, allowing the soapmaker to concentrate more on the aesthetic aspects of soap making. Because it avoids the need to handle lye, a hazardous and very caustic chemical, it is a hobby even children can enjoy under adult supervision. Unlike cold-processed soap, which requires a period of "curing" to allow saponification to complete and excess water to evaporate, the "melt and pour" process is completed once the base has cooled and hardened. The meltable base is usually naturally rich in glycerine, a by-product of saponification that has humectant and emollient properties, whereas commercial soap bars have often had this component removed.

As with the rebatching method, it can be considered a misnomer to refer to the melt and pour process as soap making. The process has much in common with candle making using meltable wax which, using a similar process, can be scented, dyed, and shaped on a small or large scale of production.

Other processes used by soapers are cold process, hot process and rebatching.

== See also ==
- Soapmaking
