= Flash freezing =

Quick freezing by exposure to cryogenic temperatures

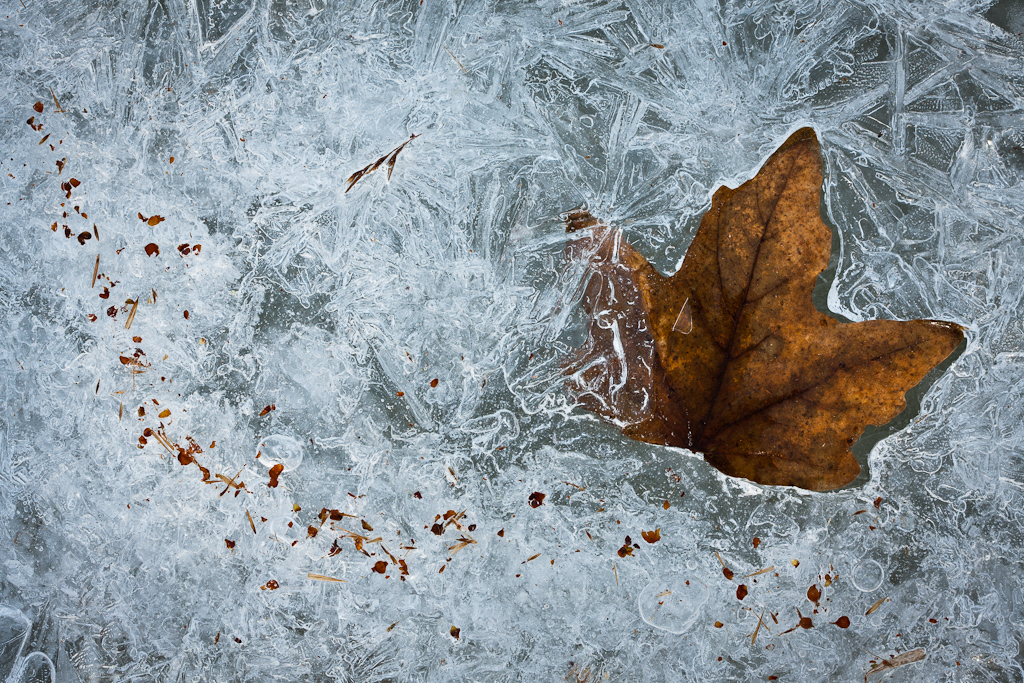
Ice crystals in a frozen pond. When the water cools slowly, crystals are formed. Freezing quickly reduces crystal formation.

In physics and chemistry, flash freezing is a process by which an object is rapidly frozen by subjecting an object to cryogenic temperatures, or through direct contact with liquid nitrogen at −196 °C (−320.8 °F).

This process is closely related to classical nucleation theory. When water freezes slowly, crystals grow from fewer nucleation sites, resulting in fewer and larger ice crystals. This damages cell walls and causes cell dehydration. When water freezes quickly, as in flash freezing, there are more nucleation sites, and more, smaller crystals. This results in much less damage to cell walls, proportional to the rate of freezing. This is why flash freezing is good for food and tissue preservation.

Flash freezing is commonly applied in the food industry and is studied in atmospheric science.

== Impact of freezing ==
The surface environment does not play a decisive role in the formation of ice and snow. Density fluctuations within water droplets result in the possible freezing regions covering both the interior and the surface—that is, whether freezing from the surface or from within may be at random.

There are phenomena like supercooling, in which the water is cooled below its freezing point but remains liquid if there are too few defects to seed crystallization. One can therefore observe a delay until the water adjusts to the new, below-freezing temperature. Supercooled liquid water must become ice at −48 °C (−54 °F), not just because of the extreme cold, but because the molecular structure of water changes physically to form tetrahedron shapes, with each water molecule loosely bonded to four others. This suggests the structural change from liquid to "intermediate ice". The crystallization of ice from supercooled water is generally initiated by a process called nucleation. The speed and size of nucleation occurs within nanoseconds and nanometers.

As water freezes, tiny amounts of liquid water are theoretically still present, even as temperatures go below −48 °C (−54 °F) and almost all the water has turned solid, either into crystalline ice or amorphous water. However, this remaining liquid water crystallizes too fast for its properties to be detected or measured. The freezing speed directly influences the nucleation process and ice crystal size. A supercooled liquid will stay in a liquid state below the normal freezing point when it has little opportunity for nucleation—that is, if it is pure enough and is in a smooth-enough container. Once agitated it will rapidly become a solid.

During the final stage of freezing, an ice drop develops a pointy tip, which is not observed for most other liquids, and arises because water expands as it freezes. Once the liquid is completely frozen, the sharp tip of the drop attracts water vapor in the air, much like a sharp metal lightning rod attracts electrical charges. The water vapor collects on the tip and a tree of small ice crystals starts to grow. An opposite effect has been shown to preferentially extract water molecules from the sharp edge of potato wedges in the oven.

If a microscopic droplet of water is cooled very fast, it forms a glass—a low-density amorphous ice in which all the tetrahedral water molecules are not aligned but amorphous. The change in the structure of water controls the rate at which ice forms. Depending on its temperature and pressure, water ice has 16 different crystalline forms in which water molecules cling to each other with hydrogen bonds.

== Concepts ==
=== Nucleation ===
Crystal growth or nucleation is the formation of a new thermodynamic phase or a new structure via self-assembly. Nucleation is often found to be very sensitive to impurities in the system. For nucleation of a new thermodynamic phase, such as the formation of ice in water below 0 °C (32 °F), if the system is not evolving with time and nucleation occurs in one step, then the probability that nucleation has not occurred should undergo exponential decay. This can also be observed in the nucleation of ice in supercooled small water droplets. The decay rate of the exponential gives the nucleation rate and is given by

$$R\ =\ N_S Zj\exp \left( \frac{-\Delta G^*}{k_BT} \right)$$

where

- $N_S$ is the number of nucleation sites;
- $Z$ is the probability that a nucleus at the top of the barrier will go on to form the new phase, not dissolve (called the Zeldovich factor);
- $j$ is the rate at which molecules attach to the nucleus, causing it to grow;
- $\Delta G^*$ is the free energy cost of the nucleus at the top of the nucleation barrier;
- $k_BT$ is the thermal energy, where $T$ is the absolute temperature and $k_B$ is the Boltzmann constant.

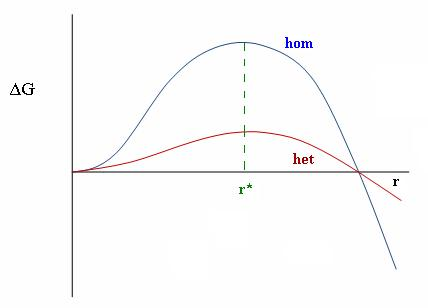
Difference in energy barriers. Homogeneous nucleation (blue) has a higher nucleation barrier $\Delta G^*$at r_{c} than heterogeneous nucleation (red).

Classical nucleation theory is a widely used approximate theory for estimating these rates, and how they vary with variables such as temperature. It correctly predicts that the time needed for nucleation decreases extremely rapidly when supersaturated.

Nucleation can be divided into homogeneous nucleation and heterogeneous nucleation. Homogeneous nucleation is the rarer, but simpler, case. In homogeneous nucleation, classical nucleation theory assumes that for a microscopic, spherical nucleus of a new phase, the free energy change of a droplet $\Delta G(r)$ is a function of the size of the nucleus, and can be written as the sum of terms proportional to the nucleus' volume and surface area:

$$\Delta G={\frac{4}{3}}\pi r^{3}\Delta g+4\pi r^{2}\sigma$$

The first term represents volume, and (assuming a spherical nucleus) this is the volume of a sphere of radius $r$. Here, $\Delta g$ is the difference in free energy per unit volume between the thermodynamic phase in which nucleation is occurring, and the phase that is nucleating. The second term represents the surface area, again assuming a sphere, where $\sigma$ is the surface tension.

At some intermediate value of $r$, the free energy $\Delta G$ goes through a maximum, and so the probability of formation of a nucleus goes through a minimum. This occurs when $\frac{dG}{dr}=0$. This point, $\Delta G^*$, is called the critical nucleus and represents the nucleation barrier; it occurs at the critical radius

$$r_c=-{\frac{2\sigma}{\Delta g}}$$

The addition of new molecules to nuclei larger than this critical radius decreases the free energy, so these nuclei are more probable.

Heterogeneous nucleation occurs at a surface or impurity. In this case, part of the nucleus boundary is accommodated by the surface or impurity onto which it is nucleating. This reduces the surface area term in $\Delta G$, and thus lowers the nucleation barrier $\Delta G^*$. This lowered barrier is what makes heterogeneous nucleation much more common and faster than homogeneous nucleation.

=== Laplace pressure ===
The Laplace pressure is the pressure difference between the inside and the outside of a curved surface between a gas region and a liquid region. The Laplace pressure is determined from the Young–Laplace equation given as

$$\Delta P \equiv P_\text{inside} - P_\text{outside} = \gamma\left(\frac{1}{R_1}+\frac{1}{R_2}\right)$$

where $R_1$ and $R_2$ are the principal radii of curvature and $\gamma$ (also denoted as $\sigma$) is the surface tension.

The surface tension can be defined in terms of force or energy. The surface tension of a liquid is the ratio of the change in the liquid's energy and the change in the liquid's surface area (which led to the change in energy). It can be defined as $\gamma=\frac{W}{\Delta A}$. This work $W$ is interpreted as the potential energy.

== Applications and techniques ==
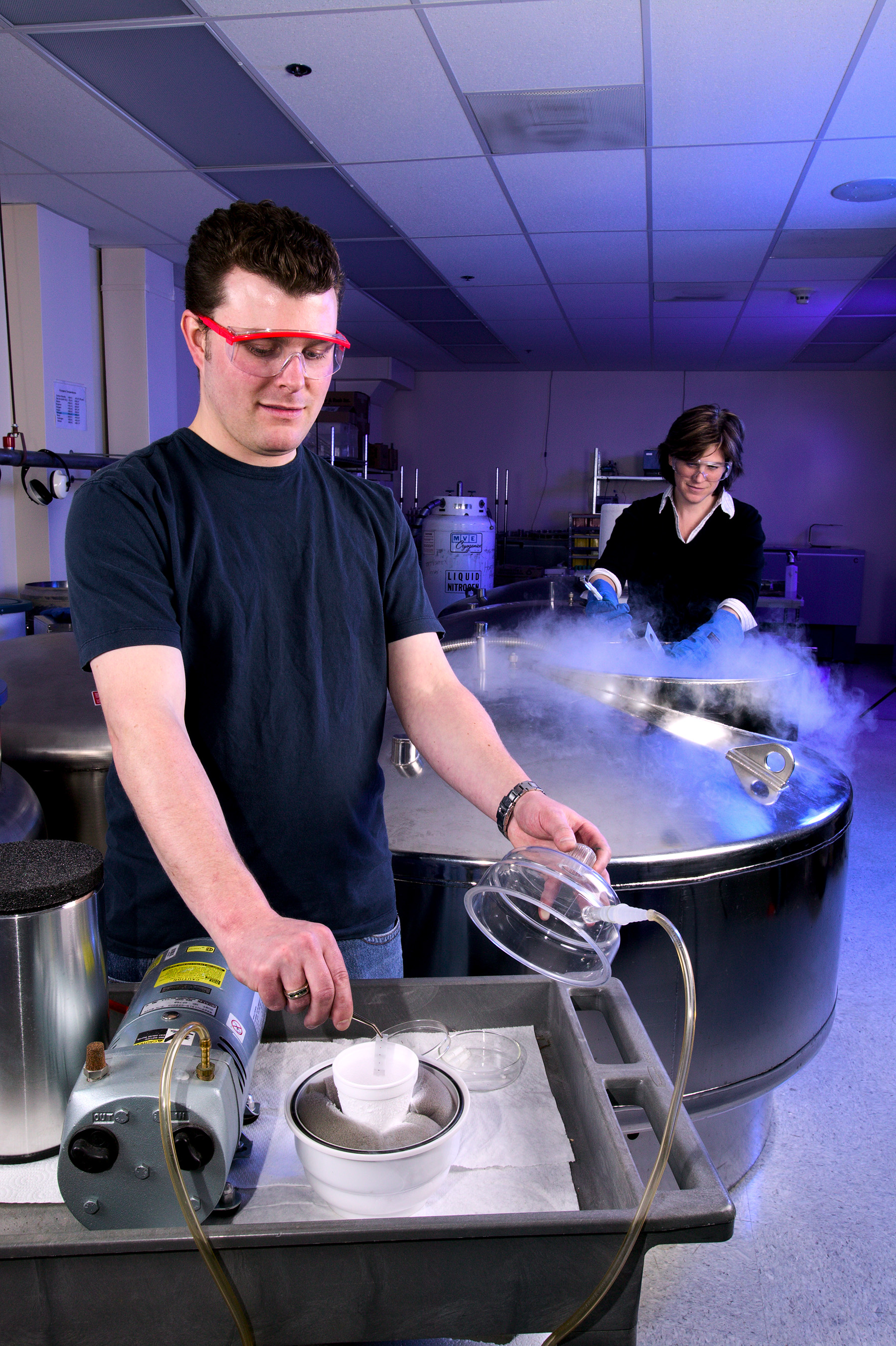
Flash freezing being used for cryopreservation

Flash freezing is used in the food industry to quickly freeze perishable food items (see frozen food). In this case, food items are subjected to temperatures well below the freezing point of water. Thus, smaller ice crystals are formed, causing less damage to cell membranes. American inventor Clarence Birdseye developed the "quick-freezing" process of food preservation in the 20th century using a cryogenic process. In practice, a mechanical freezing process is usually used instead due to cost. There has been continuous optimization of the freezing rate in mechanical freezing to minimize ice crystal size.

Flash freezing techniques are also used to freeze biological samples quickly so that large ice crystals cannot form and damage the sample. This is done by submerging the sample in liquid nitrogen or a mixture of dry ice and ethanol.

Flash freezing is of great importance in atmospheric science, as its study is necessary for a proper climate model for the formation of ice clouds in the upper troposphere, which effectively scatter incoming solar radiation and prevent Earth from becoming overheated by the Sun. The results have important implications in climate control research. One of the current debates is whether the formation of ice occurs near the surface or within the micrometre-sized droplets suspended in clouds. If it is the former, effective engineering approaches may exist to tune the surface tension of water so that the ice crystallization rate can be controlled.

== See also ==
- Frozen food – Food stored at very low temperatures
