= Sous vide =

Cooking method using prolonged low temperatures

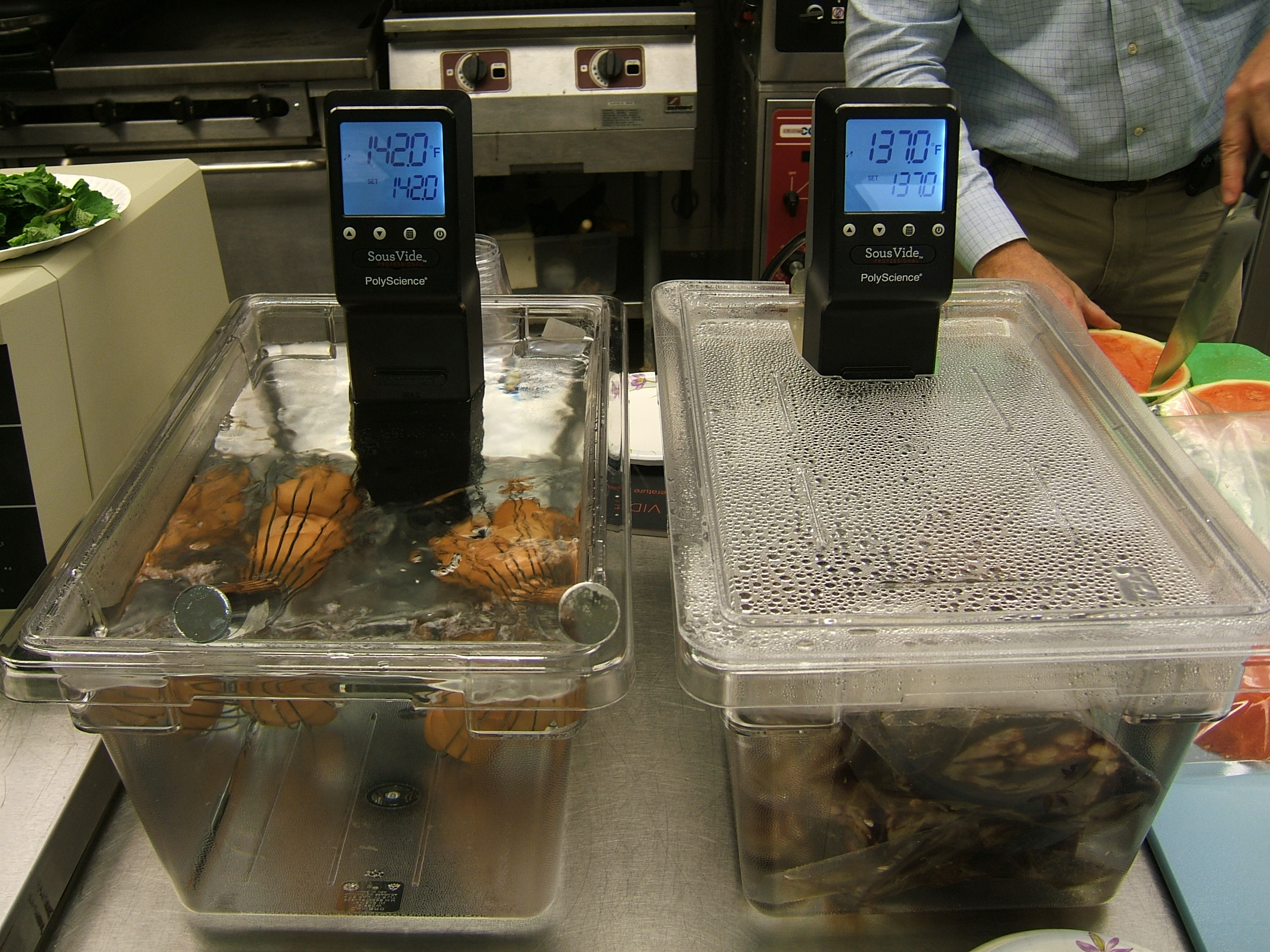
Sous vide cooking using thermal immersion circulator machines

Sous vide (/suː ˈviːd/; French for 'under vacuum'), also known as low-temperature, long-time (LTLT) cooking, is a method of cooking, invented by the French chef Georges Pralus in 1974, in which food is placed in a plastic pouch or a glass jar and cooked in a water bath for longer than usual cooking times (usually one to seven hours, and more than three days in some cases) at a precisely regulated temperature.

The temperature is much lower than usually used for cooking, typically around 55 to 60 °C (130 to 140 °F) for red meat, 66 to 71 °C (150 to 160 °F) for poultry, and higher for vegetables. The intent is to cook the item evenly, ensuring that the inside is properly cooked without overcooking the outside, and to retain moisture.

== History ==
A video overview of the sous vide cooking process

Sous vide cooking is characterized by low temperatures, durations longer than conventional, and containers (such as plastic bags) that contain minimal air and separate food from the heating environment.

Low-temperature cooking was first described by Benjamin Thompson, Count Rumford in 1799. He used air as the heat-transfer medium in his experiments while attempting to see if he could roast meat in a machine which he had created to dry potatoes. In Thompson's own words, the meat was "not merely eatable, but perfectly done, and most singularly well-tasted".

Preparation of food under vacuum, with or without heat, was developed by American and French engineers in the mid-1960s as an industrial food preservation method. As with Rumford, the researchers learned that the food showed distinctive improvements in flavor and texture. Sealing food under vacuum is sometimes called Cryovacking based on the Sealed Air trade name Cryovac. The vacuum notably concentrated the flavors of fruits, even without cooking.

The method was adopted by Georges Pralus, a French chef, in 1974 for the Restaurant Troisgros (of Pierre and Michel Troisgros) in Roanne, France. He discovered that when foie gras was cooked in this manner it kept its original appearance, did not lose excess amounts of fat, and had better texture.

Another pioneer in sous vide is Bruno Goussault, the French chief scientist of food manufacturer Cuisine Solutions, based in Sterling, Virginia. In 1991, he established Centre de Recherche et d'Études pour l'Alimentation (CREA) as the service arm of its parent company, Cuisine Solutions. Due to his research into the effects of temperature on various foods, through CREA, he became well known for training top chefs in the method. He developed the parameters of cooking times and temperatures for various foods.

Goussault and Pralus independently worked on development of sous vide in the 1970s and eventually became collaborators. Goussault pioneered the marriage of vacuum sealing with low-temperature cooking. Pralus, considered the father of modern sous vide, cooked at higher temperatures.

== Essential features ==
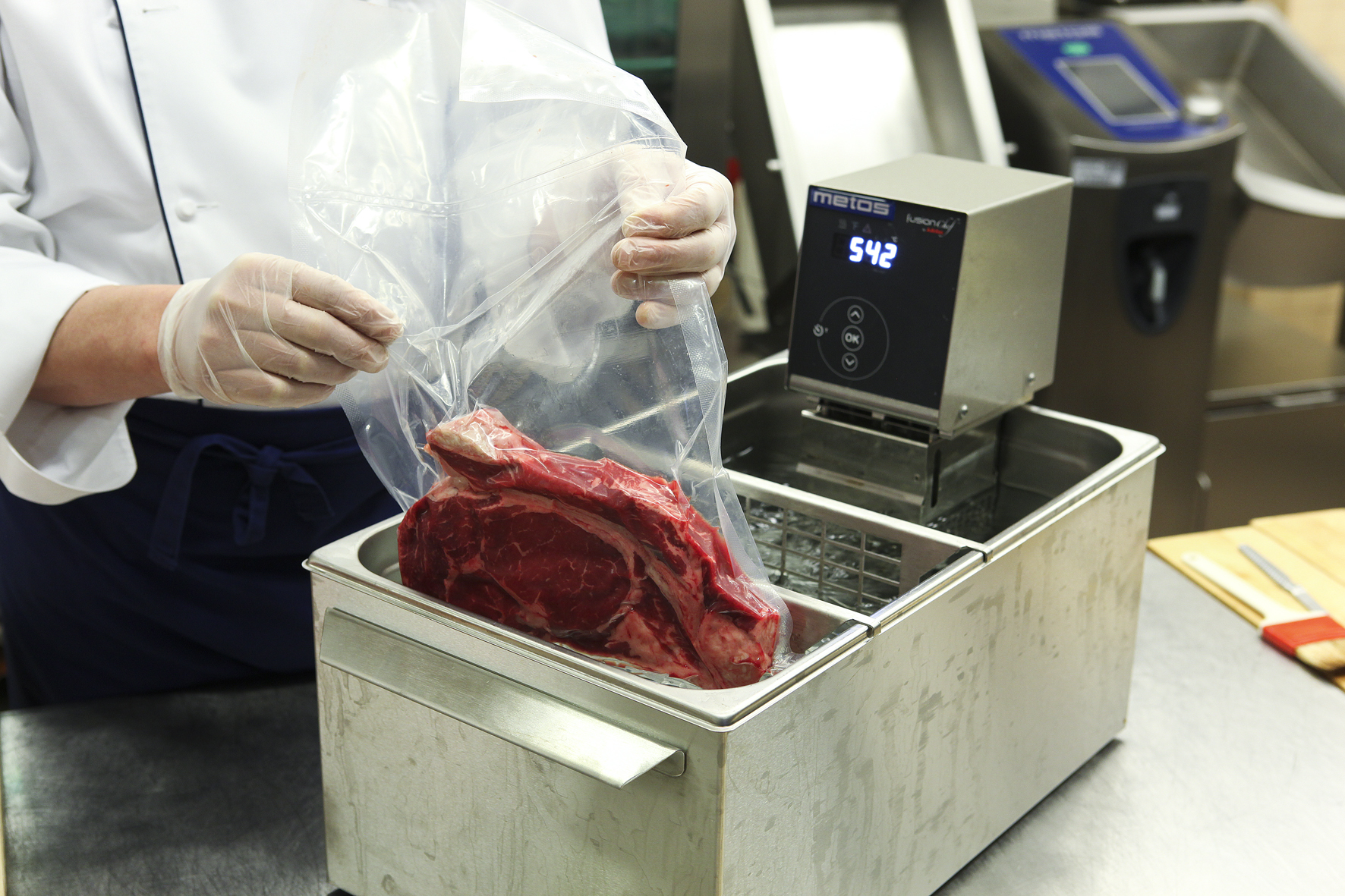
A steak being prepared sous vide

Sealing the food in sturdy plastic bags retains juices and aroma that otherwise would be lost in the process. Placing the packaged food in a water bath, with the temperature set at the desired final cooking temperature of the food, prevents overcooking, because the food cannot get hotter than the bath it is in, as in bain-marie.

As a result of precise temperature control of the bath and the fact that the bath temperature is the same as the target cooking temperature, very precise control of cooking can be achieved. Additionally, temperature, and thus cooking, can be very even throughout the food in sous vide cooking, even with irregularly shaped and very thick items, given enough time.

By contrast, in conventional high-heat cooking, such as oven roasting or grilling, the food is exposed to heat levels that are much higher than the desired internal cooking temperature, and it must be removed from the high heat prior to reaching the desired cooking temperature. If the food is removed from the heat too late, it becomes overcooked, and if it is removed too early, it is undercooked.

The use of temperatures much lower than those used for conventional cooking is an essential feature of sous vide. When cooking meat, tough collagen in connective tissue can be denatured into gelatin without heating the meat's proteins high enough that they denature to a degree that the texture toughens and moisture is exuded from the meat.

In contrast, soft vegetables when boiled are often considered overcooked. Low-temperature cooking allows plant matter to remain more succulent, as the cell walls do not burst. Cooking vegetables at temperatures below the boiling point of water allows them to be thoroughly cooked (and pasteurized, if necessary) while maintaining a firm or somewhat crisp texture. While the cell walls will generally not burst, the depolymerization of the pectic polysaccharides that connect the vegetable cells together and the gelatinisation of starch in the vegetable can be achieved without overcooking.

From a culinary viewpoint, the exclusion of air is secondary, but this has practical importance. It allows cooked food to be stored, still sealed and refrigerated, for considerable times, which is especially useful for the catering industry, and it excludes oxygen from food that requires long cooking and is susceptible to oxidation, e.g., fat on meat, which may become rancid with prolonged exposure to air. It also improves the transfer of heat between the water bath and food, without the thermal insulating properties of any trapped air in the bag.

Apart from ensuring uniform cooking, sous vide cooking facilitates development of desired organoleptic flavors and limits off flavors due to oxidation.

== Temperature ==
The degree of accuracy and constancy of cooking temperature required varies with the food cooked. In some cases, it is not critical. A 15-millimetre-thick (0.59 in) piece of fish will cook in 17 to 18 minutes at any temperature from 44 °C (111 °F) to 61 °C (142 °F). Such food can be cooked in a switched-off slow cooker filled with hot water and a thermometer.

For an egg, though, which has proteins that denature at different temperatures, maintaining precise, constant temperature is more critical. Confit egg yolks are usually cooked at 63 °C (145 °F), which is hot enough to cook the white without setting the yolk. The temperature of the bath is set to 64 °C (147 °F).

Regular cooking times are determined by when the center of the cooked item reaches a few degrees below the targeted temperature. Then heating should be stopped immediately. While the food rests, residual heat will continue to cook it for a while. If the heating continues, the food will be overcooked. The time taken for the center of food to reach the target temperature depends on the initial temperature, the thickness and shape of the food, and the temperature of the bath.

== Limitations ==
One limitation of sous vide cooking is that browning (Maillard reactions) happens at temperatures above the boiling point of water. The flavors and "crust" texture developed by browning are generally seen as very desirable in the cooking of certain types of meat, such as a steak. The flavors and texture produced by browning cannot be obtained with only the sous vide technique. In many cases, chefs will brown meats and other foods before or after sous vide cooking, using techniques such as torching or searing on an extremely hot pan. This secondary browning is done briefly, and sometimes at higher heat than usually used, so as to affect only the surface of the food and to avoid overcooking the interior. Similarly, the skin of fish can be cooked at high temperatures after the sous vide to make the skin crisp.

== Safety ==
Food safety is a function of both time and temperature; a temperature usually considered insufficient to render food safe may be perfectly safe if maintained for long enough. Some sous vide fish recipes, for example, are cooked below 55 °C (131 °F). People with compromised immunity should never eat food that has not been properly pasteurized. Women eating unpasteurized food while pregnant expose themselves and their fetuses to risk and thus may choose to avoid unpasteurized recipes.

Clostridium botulinum bacteria can grow in food in the absence of oxygen and produce the deadly botulinum toxin, so sous vide cooking must be performed under carefully controlled conditions to avoid botulism poisoning. Generally speaking, food that is heated and served within four hours is considered safe, but meat that is cooked for longer to tenderize must reach a temperature of at least 55 °C (131 °F) within four hours and then be kept there for sufficient time, to pasteurize the meat.

Pasteurization kills the botulism bacteria, but the possibility of hardy botulism spores surviving and reactivating once cool remains a concern as with many preserved foods, however processed. For that reason, Baldwin's treatise specifies precise chilling requirements for cook–chill, so that the botulism spores do not have the opportunity to grow or propagate. Pasteurized food can then be stored for up to two weeks around 3 °C (37 °F) sealed within the vacuum pack. Exposure to air also inactivates spore growth.

=== Endocrine disruptors ===
Most plastics release estrogenic chemicals that act as endocrine disruptors when heated. The degree of danger posed is controversial.

Also, some evidence shows that heterocyclic aromatic amines and bisphenol-A migrate from the plastic container into the food in sous vide cooking.

== Uses ==
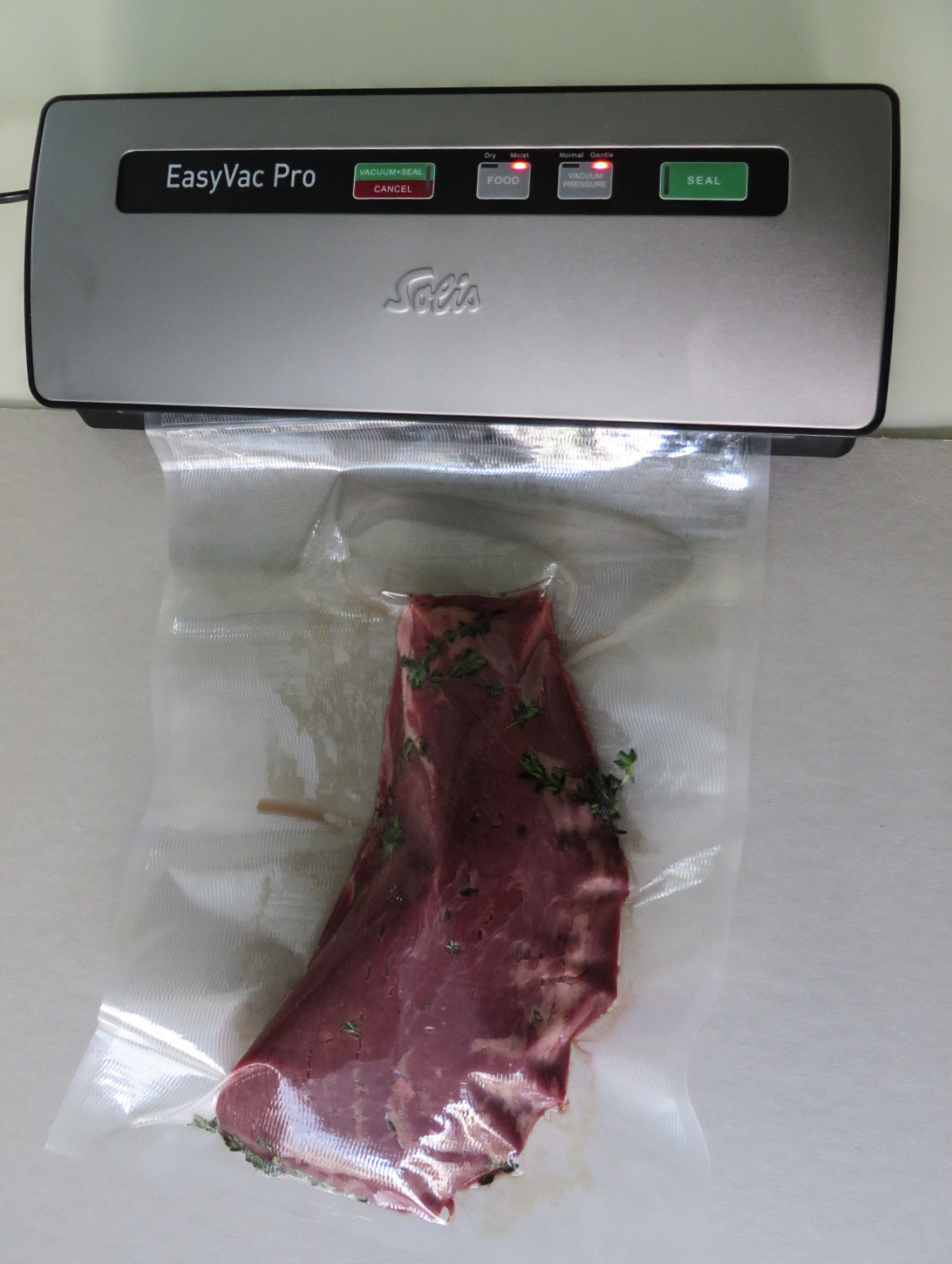
Compact vacuum-packing and sealing device

The sous vide method is used in many high-end gourmet restaurants by chefs such as Heston Blumenthal, Paul Bocuse, Michael Carlson, Thomas Keller, Grant Achatz, Ferran Adrià, Joël Robuchon, Philippe Rochat, Alessandro Stratta, Charlie Trotter, Michael Mina and Joan Roca. Amtrak also uses this method for meals served on their trains, including the Acela.

Sous vide has become common on cooking TV shows such as Iron Chef America and Top Chef, and in restaurants such as Panera Bread. It has also been used to quickly produce significant quantities of meals for hurricane evacuees. Nonprofessional cooks are also beginning to use sous vide cooking.

Initially, enthusiasts used laboratory-grade thermal immersion circulators, often bought used on eBay and – however carefully cleaned – not designed for kitchen use. Beginning in 2008, Auber Instruments and Fresh Meals Solutions made available comparatively inexpensive yet highly accurate PID controllers with attached thermocouple probes that could be used to control commercial rice cookers, slow cookers, electric stock pots, and similar apparatuses. In late 2009, several machines intended for home use and less expensive than laboratory-standard equipment were available for purchase.

Duplicating some effects of sous vide techniques is possible through the use of a rigid-sided, insulated container, such as a "beer cooler", filled with warm water, checked with an accurate thermometer, and coupled with resealable bags, which allow the air to be removed, to package the food for cooking. However, the heat loss involved in this technique makes it infeasible for long-term (four-plus hours) cooking.

Sous vide, French for "under vacuum", implies that food should be sealed in a plastic bag with all the air removed. As an alternative method to a commercial or home vacuum sealer, the food may be placed in an open-sided plastic bag, and then partially submerged into the water, which displaces/forces out the air. This method involves clipping the open side of the bag to the side of the pot to keep water from leaking into the opening. The goal is to have the food completely in contact with the hot water to ensure even cooking while reducing off flavors from oxidation.

Lower-cost units are now available in the form of a "stick", which has a clip to attach it to the side of the cooking vessel. Sous vide sticks provide a heating element, controller, and motorized impeller. The higher-cost units provide a more precise degree of control over the water temperature. Devices are becoming more user-friendly, with apps affiliated with most of the devices. Apps guide people through the cooking process, with some units having voice-control integration and Wi-Fi interfaces to control the device remotely.

== See also ==
- Bain-marie
- Boil-in-bag
- Combi steamer
- Slow cooker
- Water jacket – mechanical component utilizing the same principle for precise temperature control
