= Boil-in-bag =

Packaged food product

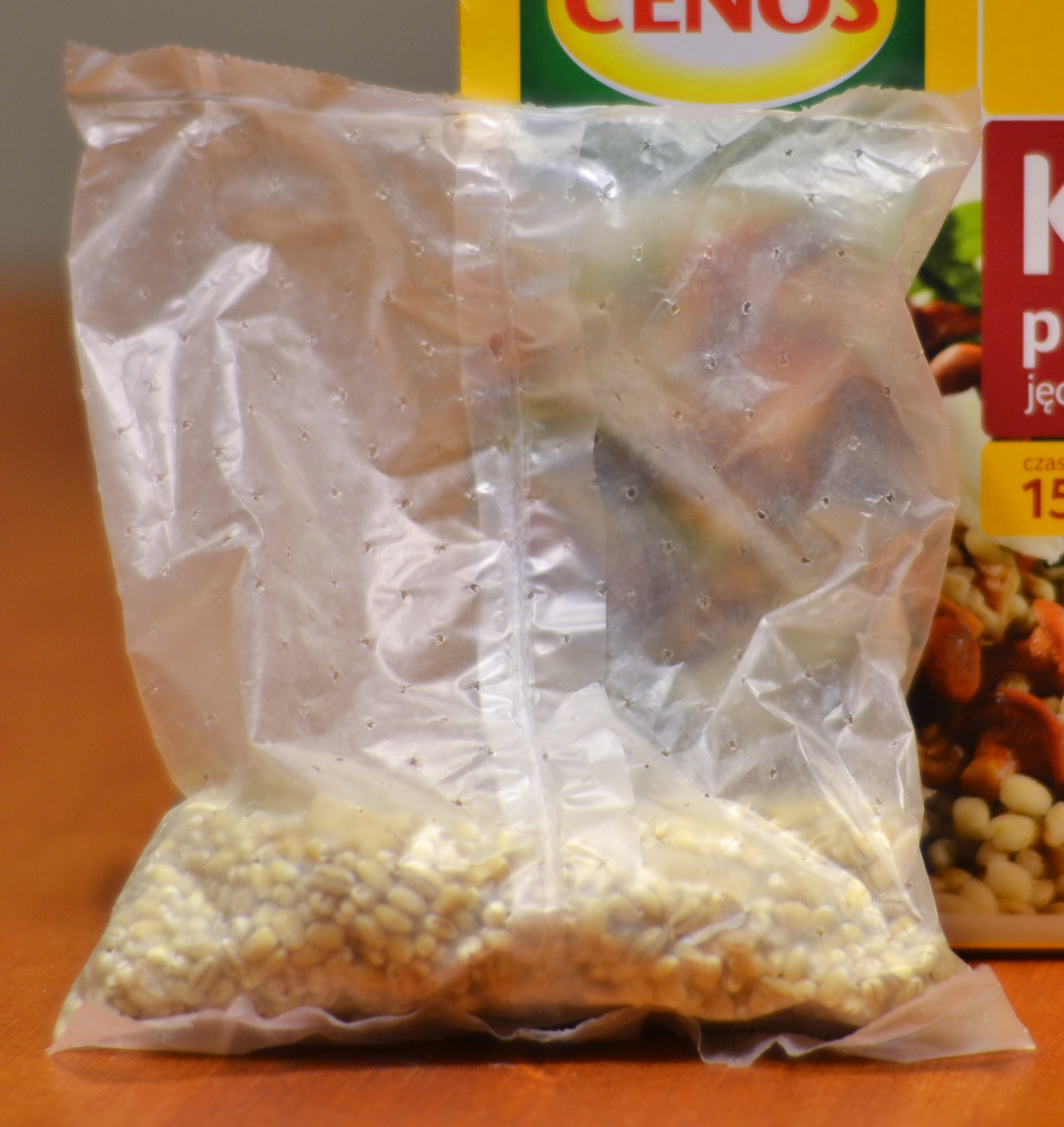
Boil-in-bag packed pearl barley

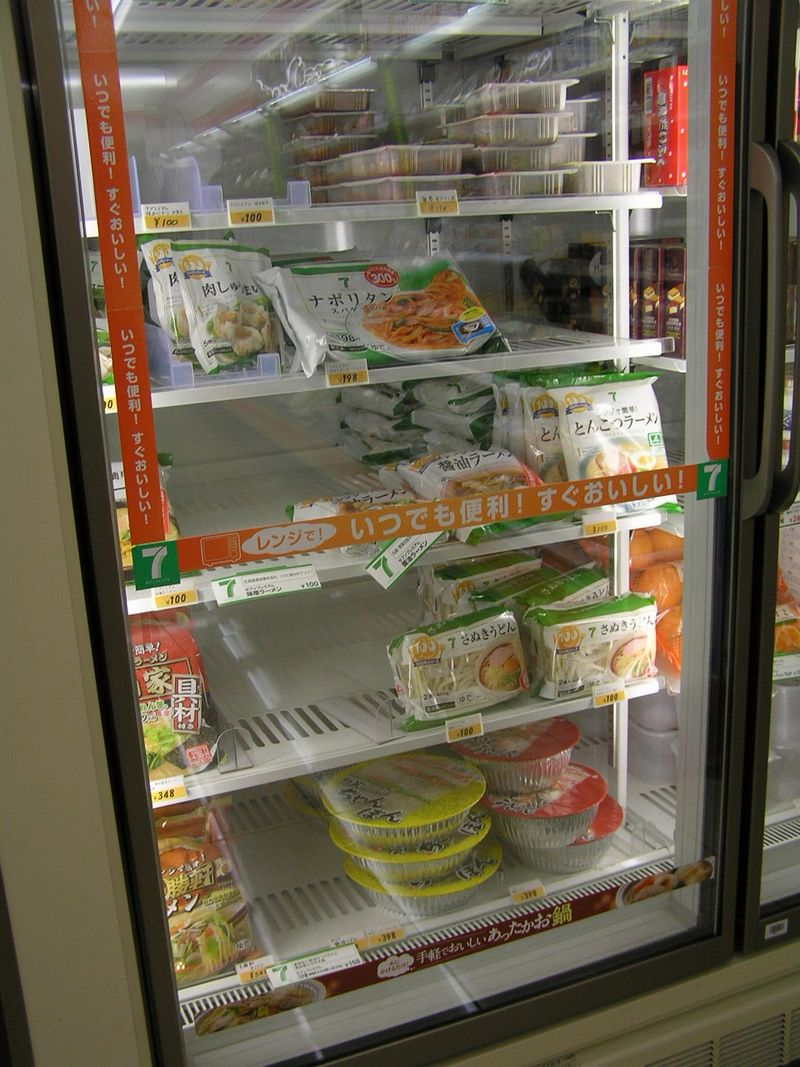
Some frozen food is sold in boil-in-bags for subsequent heating.

Boil-in-bags are a form of packaged food products in which bagged food is heated or cooked in boiling water. Plastic bags can be solid and impermeable for holding frozen foods; alternatively, bags can be porous or perforated to allow boiling water into the bag.

Food packaged in this manner is often sold as boil-in-the-bag.

== Solid bags ==
Prepared foods can be securely packed into plastic bags, frozen, and often packed into paperboard folding cartons. A consumer takes the pouch and places it into boiling water for a specified period. The bag is either cut open or can have an easy-opening feature.

Bags are usually not suited for microwave heating unless they are punctured to release pressure. Some have self-venting features.

== Porous bags ==
Some dry products, typically grains, are sold in perforated plastic bags and designed for convenient cooking directly in the enclosure. Upon cooking, the food can be drained easily by removing the bag from the water, without use of additional kitchen utensils.

The most popular product sold as boil-in-bag is rice, but other cereals like pearl barley or pseudocereals like buckwheat are also available.

Typically, temperature-resistant, perforated polypropylene bags are used as food enclosures.

== See also ==
- Sous vide
- Retort pouch
- Frozen food
