= Bathwater =

Bathwater may refer to:

- "Bathwater" (song), a 2000 song by No Doubt
- Bathwater, water used in bathing
- "Bathwater", 2006 documentary by Kris Williams

== See also ==
- Don't throw the baby out with the bathwater
- Water bath (disambiguation)
