= Oil bath =

Heated bath used in a laboratory

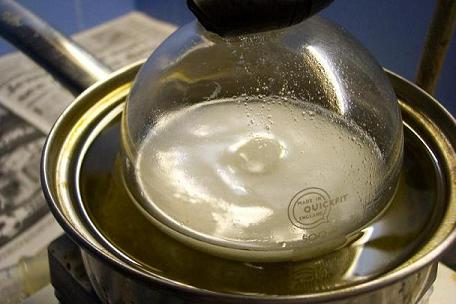
A pot of oil on a heat source

An oil bath is a type of heated bath used in a laboratory, most commonly used to heat up chemical reactions. It is a container of oil that is heated by a hot plate or (in rare cases) a Bunsen burner.

== Use ==
These baths are commonly used to heat reaction mixtures more evenly than would be possible with a hot plate alone, as the entire outside of the reaction flask is heated. Generally, silicone oil is used in modern oil baths, although mineral oil, cottonseed oil and even phosphoric acid have been used in the past.

== Hazards ==
Overheating the oil bath can result in a fire hazard, especially if mineral oil is being used. Generally, the maximum safe operating temperature of a mineral oil bath is approximately 160 °C (320 °F), the oil's flash point. Mineral oil cannot be used above 310 °C (590 °F) due to the compound's boiling point. If higher temperatures are needed, a silicone oil or a sand bath may be used instead. Silicone oil baths are effective in the 25 °C (77 °F) - 230 °C (446 °F) range. Sand baths are effective from 25 °C (77 °F) to above 500 °C (932 °F).

== In mechanics ==
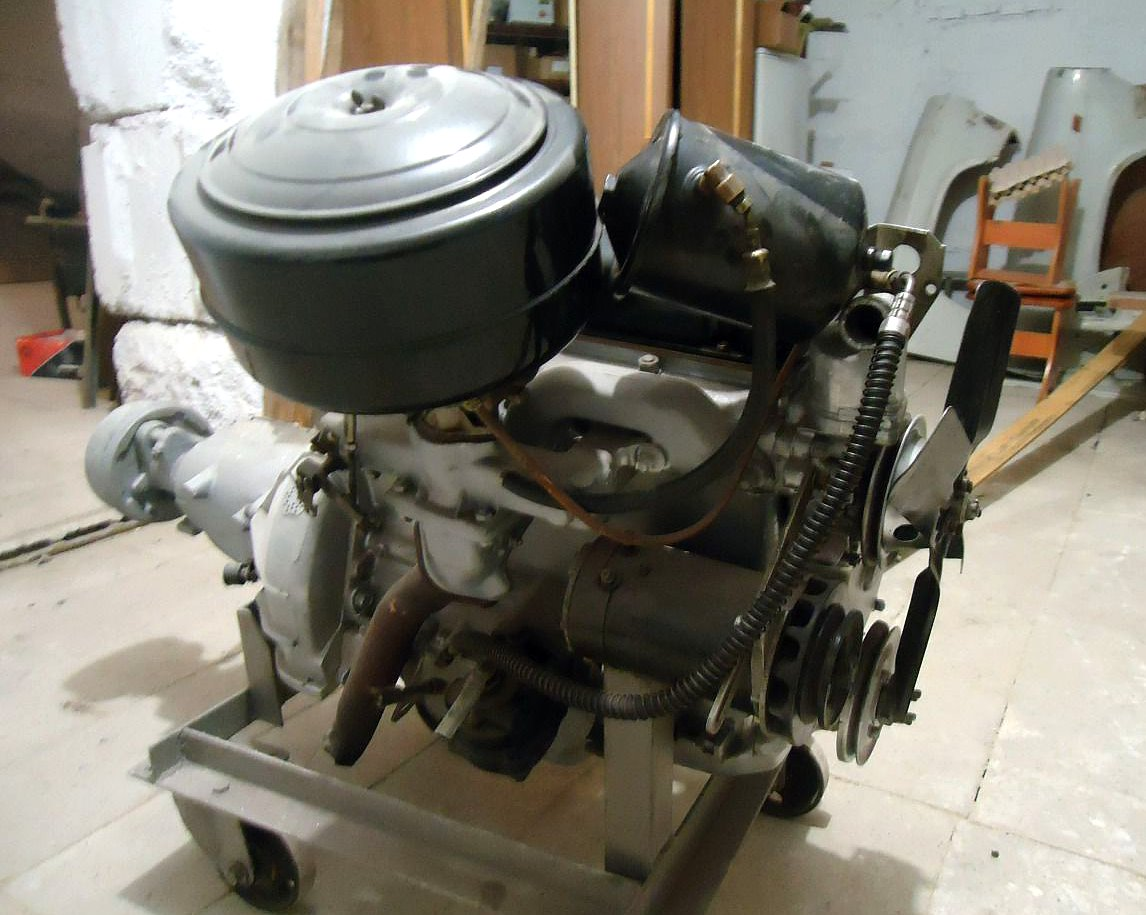
An oil bath air filter at the upper left in a GAZ-21 engine

Another use of an oil bath is to filter particulates out of air, by leading the air stream through an unheated oil bath. This type of air filter was used in car and tractor engines, but has been replaced by modern paper air filters; some small engines continue to use this system. In some cases oil baths are used to heat bearings so they expand before installing them on shafts of aircraft engines and tractors.

== See also ==
- Laboratory water bath
- Bain-marie
