= Guitar pickup potting =

Process for reducing feedback in electric guitar pickups

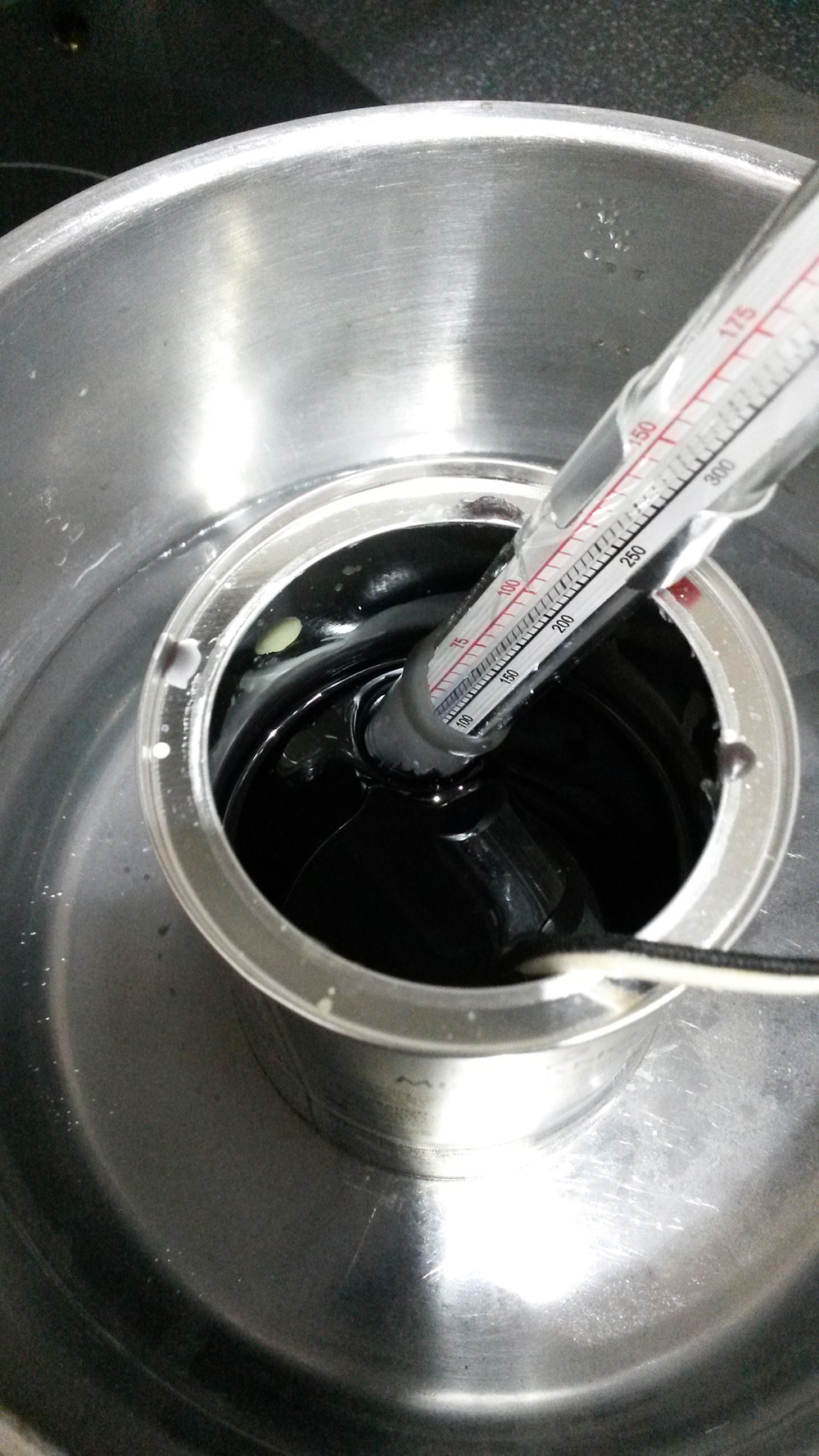
A guitar pickup being potted in a wax mixture at approximately 140°F

Guitar pickup potting is a process whereby the fine wire coils of a guitar pickup are encapsulated in a substance that inhibits movement of the coil. Guitar pickups are generally made from bobbins wrapped in many thousands of turns of fine wire. If the wire is left unpotted it is possible for unwanted microphonics or oscillations to occur, causing the pickup to "howl". This is often apparent when using overdriven amplifiers and distortion pedals. Potting also protects the delicate winding from damage.

Generally, the potting medium is a wax mixture that is melted (see photo) and then permeates the wire coils. Other substances such as nitrocellulose lacquer or epoxy resins can also be used.

== See also ==
- Potting_(electronics)
