= Cuisine Solutions =

American premium foods company

Cuisine Solutions logo.

Cuisine Solutions is an American premium foods company that specializes in the sous-vide method of cooking and meal preparation. Originally founded in 1971 under the name Vie de France, the company now maintains headquarters and manufacturing facilities in Sterling, Virginia, Alexandria, VA, and San Antonio, TX, as well as manufacturing facilities in Thailand and France. Cuisine Solutions is currently the world’s largest manufacturer of sous-vide prepared foods and serves a variety of partners, including international airlines, cruise ship operators, the U.S. military, major hotel chains, restaurant franchises, retailers, and K–12 schools.

== History ==
The sous-vide sealing process was first popularized as a preservation method in the 1960s, and the following decade saw the increasing popularization of sous-vide products and prepared foods. Most of the innovation was the work of French chefs, with Dr. Bruno Goussault among the culinary experts who worked to make the technique commercially viable. Sous-vide quickly gained recognition as an effective means of preserving the texture and freshness of prepared foods, and Goussault’s research was foundational in setting the standards and procedures for sous-vide cooking methods.

Cuisine Solutions (called Vie de France, at the time) was chartered in 1974 as a premium foods manufacturer. In addition to acting as a producer of sous-vide products, Cuisine Solutions was founded with the intent of furthering research into sous-vide methods and advancing the techniques that Goussault had pioneered in the 1970s.

== Products ==
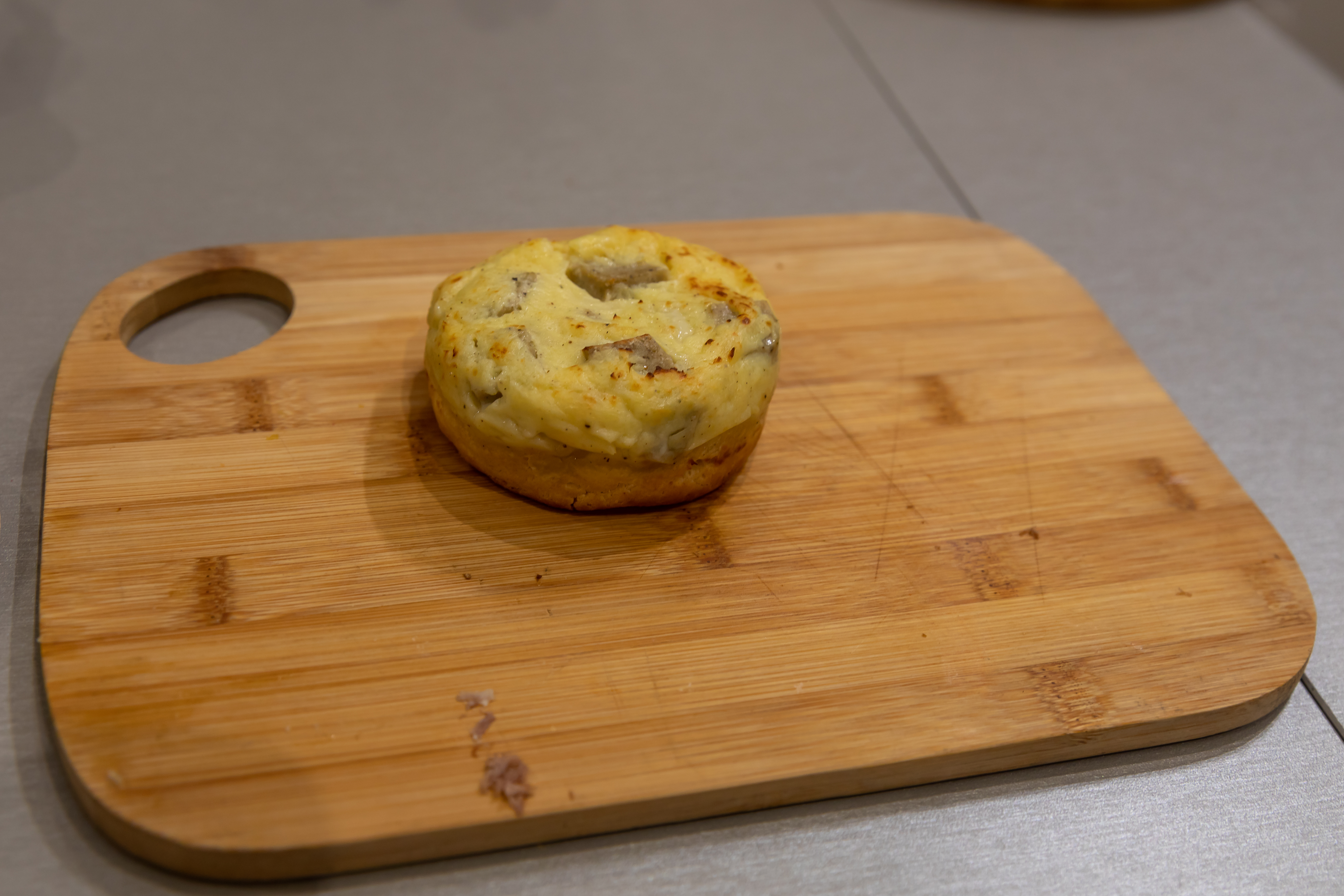
Convenience frittata made by Cuisine Solutions

Cuisine Solutions currently sells both meat-based and vegetarian products. The sous-vide cooking method is particularly useful for proteins, and the company maintains a focus on beef, lamb, poultry, vegetables, and grains. The majority of Cuisine Solutions' food production focuses on core ingredients, leaving the creativity to the end user. The company does not specialize in a particular style or region, with both European cuisine and Far East Asian cuisine products currently marketed.

== Marketing ==
Cuisine Solutions brands itself as a premium foods company, and the majority of its clientele is made up of international airlines, cruise ship operators, the U.S. military, major hotel chains, restaurant franchises, and K–12 schools. The Cuisine Solutions product line incorporates a range of cooking styles, with red meat, fish, and chicken sold in tandem with pasta and vegetarian dishes. Cuisine Solutions also provides sous-vide preparation for individuals and professional chefs.

The Cuisine Solutions marketing strategy and brand place much emphasis on the company's resident chefs, with its chief scientist, Dr. Bruno Goussault, and an accompanying roster of cooking authorities acting as public faces for Cuisine Solutions. The personality-focused branding is used as a means of promoting the company’s attention to its product line, which is created for chefs by chefs. The Cuisine Solutions culinary research and development team innovates new cooking techniques and recipes, anticipating client needs and market trends.

Cuisine Solutions launched a branded cooking magazine, Sous-Vide, in July 2016 and an accompanying website, sousvidemagazine.com, in October 2017.

== Café + Teria ==
In September 2017, Cuisine Solutions launched Café + Teria in Arlington, VA. Café + Teria is a school lunch program modeled after fast-casual dining through which students select ingredients in four steps to build a nutritious meal. Students start by picking a base of grain, salad, or a wrap; choose a protein (antibiotic-free chicken, ground beef, or Paneer cheese); add toppings (vegetables, cheese, and sauces); and finish with a dressing. The menu exclusively features Cuisine Solutions proteins, all prepared with the sous-vide method, and focuses on local ingredients.

As of August 2018, Café + Teria serves the Arlington County, Loudoun County, and Alexandria City Schools districts in Virginia.

== Chefs ==
The following individuals serve as Cuisine Solutions executive chefs:

- Gerard Bertholon, France
- Bruno Bertin, France
- Olivier Boinet, France
- Marc Brennet, Belgium
- Míguel Garcia Calderón, Peru
- Herve Chignon, France
- Bhasker Raghav, India
- Julien Vanderlynden, France
- Peter Coffey, USA
- Jeffrey Sklaney, USA
- AJ Schaller, USA
