= Bruno Goussault =

French scientist and chef, known for sous-vide cooking

Bruno Goussault (born 26 January 1942) is a French scientist, economist, inventor, and chef. He is best known for developing and promoting the modern sous-vide (French for "under vacuum") method of cooking. Before becoming the Chief Scientist at Cuisine Solutions in 2000, Bruno worked as a consultant helping to create sous-vide cooking manufacturing facilities in the United States, France, Chile, Brazil, and Norway. In 1991, he founded Centre de Recherché et d'Études pour L'Alimentation (Culinary Research and Education Academy or CREA) in Paris to train chefs on the application of sous-vide cooking. In addition to his work with Cuisine Solutions and CREA, Goussault is on the board of the Association of Chemists, Engineers and Managers of Agricultural and Food Industries.

== Education ==
Before beginning his culinary science career, Goussault earned a post-graduate degree from the d'Etudes et du Developpement Economique et Social, an MS degree in food technology from the Ecole Nationale Supérieure des Industries Agricoles et Alimentaires (now AgroParisTech), and a Ph.D. in economics from the University of Paris Pantheon.

== Career beginning ==
Goussault's food science career officially launched in 1967 when he began working with beef and ham. He spent three years in Niger, Africa experimenting with millet and sorghum milling techniques and continued his work with grains upon returning to France. This resulted in Goussault inventing a new technique for making a "super-quick-cooking '2-minute rice.'"

== Sous-vide ==
In 1970, Goussault began working with the vacuum pouch cooking method. It was also around this time, in 1972, when Goussault was involved with meat research and became a meat specialist despite being colorblind. Goussault claimed that he learned to "correlate the structures and textures people associate with particular colours to exact temperatures," and because of this, he discovered that meat cooked at lower temperatures loses less of its juices, develops a better texture, and cooks more evenly.

In 1974, a study that Goussault conducted regarding the sous-vide cooking of beef shoulder was presented at an international frozen-foods conference in Strasbourg, France, demonstrating how cooking the beef sous-vide extended its shelf life to 60 days. Goussault was later approached by Cryovac executives in 1978 and asked to add a scientific basis to Pralus' culinary training. Also in the 1980s, Goussault teamed up with three-star chef Joël Robuchon and SNCF, France's national train system, to create a new menu featuring sous-vide-prepared foods for SNCF's first-class service between Paris and Strasbourg.

In 1991, Goussault founded Centre de Recherche et d'Etudes pour L'Alimentation (Culinary Research and Education Academy or CREA) in Paris to teach students proper sous-vide cooking techniques, instructing them on how to use the method safely. Through CREA, Goussault has trained over 80% of chefs with three Michelin Guide stars.

In August 2015, under Goussault's training, Daylesford Crossing in Paoli, Pennsylvania, became the first senior-living centre in the United States to implement a sous-vide system.

In October 2025, in partnership with chef Patrick Ogheard and his team at the EHL, he published his knowledge and story in a book entitled ‘La cuisson à juste température’ (Cooking at Precise Temperature)..

== Cuisine Solutions ==
Goussault has been the Consultant of Cuisine Solutions (originally called Vie de France) since 1989, when he was hired by Stanislas Vilgrain to design a new system for producing high-quality sous-vide food on an industrial scale. Goussault began working with Cuisine Solutions' American operations in 2000, as the Chief Scientist. With a production line at Cuisine Solutions headquarters designed for 130,000 meals per day, the company now prepares sous-vide food for clients including the Super Bowl, Costco, the first-class cabins on Air France and American Airlines, the MGM Grand in Las Vegas, and hotel chains such as Westin and Hyatt. Cuisine Solutions has also worked with chef Thomas Keller on a sous-vide product line, and Goussault has helped to train the kitchen staff at both of Keller's restaurants, French Laundry and Per Se.

== Acclaim ==
Goussault received the Ordre National du Mérite from the President of France in 1995. In 2017, Goussault was named "one of the 100 greatest visionaries" by The Einstein Legacy Project and chosen for inclusion in Genius: 100 Visions of the Future, the world's first 3D-printed book.
