= Sand bath =

Laboratory heating equipment

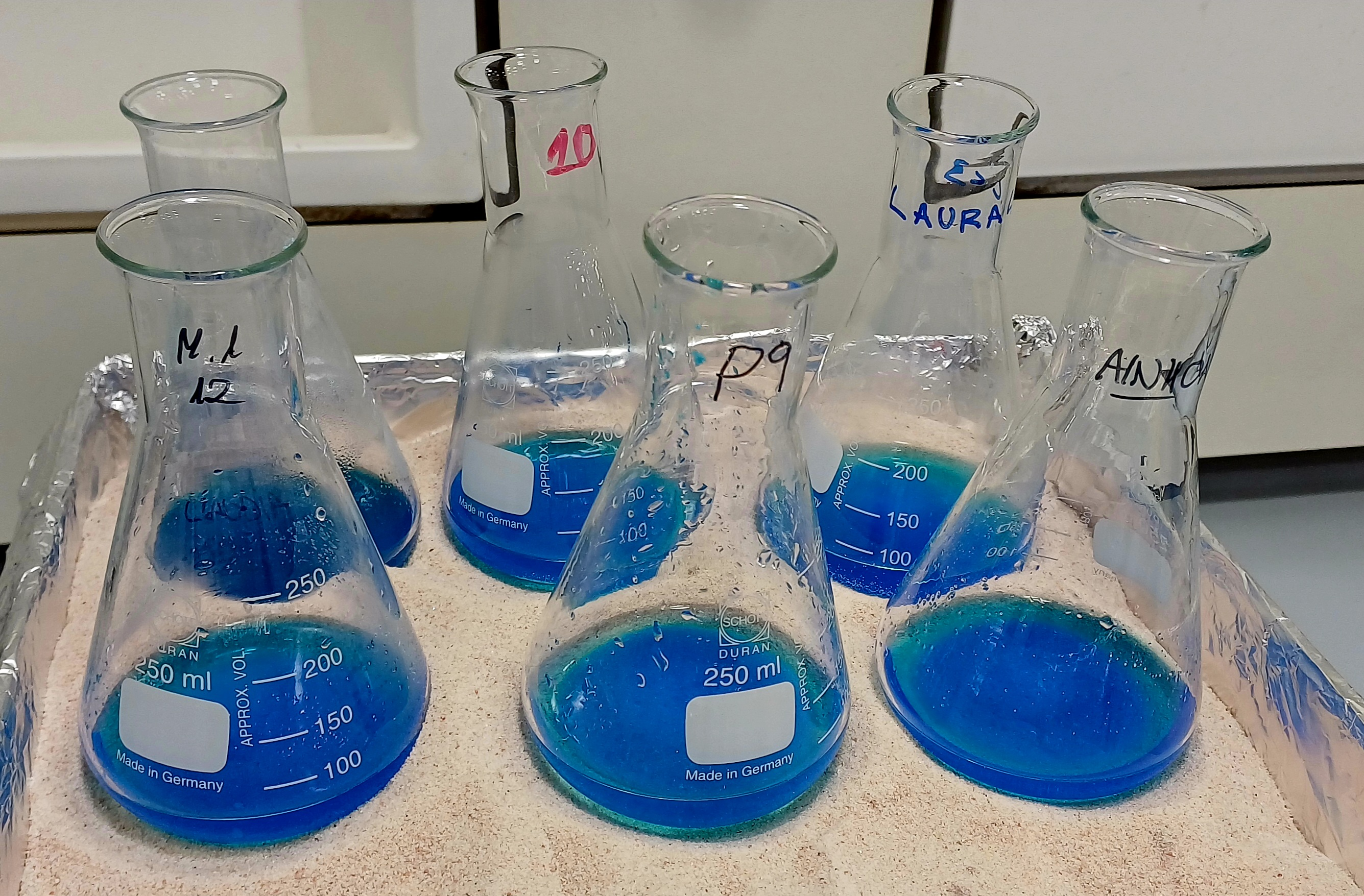
Copper sulfate solutions being heated in a sand bath

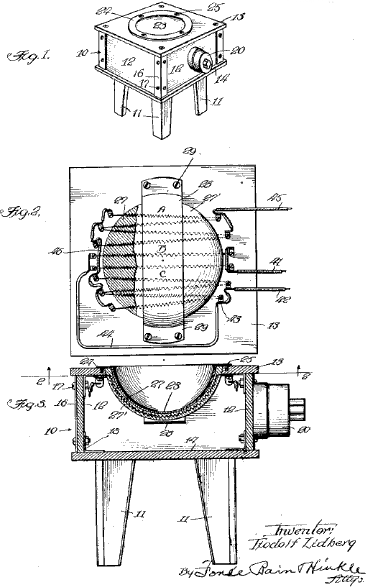
Patent illustration of a sand bath. Cutaway sections show heating elements around the bowl containing sand.

A sand bath is a common piece of laboratory equipment made from a container filled with heated sand. It is used to evenly heat another container, most often during a chemical reaction.

A sand bath is most commonly used in conjunction with a hot plate or heating mantle. A beaker is filled with sand or metal pellets (called shot) and is placed on the plate or mantle. The reaction vessel is then partially covered by sand or pellets. The sand or shot then conducts the heat from the plate to all sides of the reaction vessel.

This technique allows a reaction vessel to be heated throughout with minimal stirring, as opposed to heating the bottom of the vessel and waiting for convection to heat the remainder, cutting down on both the duration of the reaction and the possibility of side reactions that may occur at higher temperatures.

A variation on this theme is the water bath in which the sand is replaced with water. It can be used to keep a reaction vessel at the temperature of boiling water until all water is evaporated (see Standard enthalpy change of vaporization).

Sand baths are one of the oldest known pieces of laboratory equipment, having been used by the alchemists. In Arabic alchemy, a sand bath was known as a qadr. In Latin alchemy, a sand bath was called balneum siccum, balneum cineritium, or balneum arenosum.

== See also ==
- Heat bath
- Water bath
- Oil bath
