= Heated bath =

Heated bath schema. 1: Heated substance. 2: Heating medium. 3: Laboratory flask. 4: Bowl. 5: Gas burner

A heated bath is used in the laboratory to allow a chemical reaction to occur at an elevated temperature. Heated baths are a type of thermal reservoir and equilibrium system that is able to add heat evenly to a system without changing the temperature of the fluid being used. Heated baths are often used as steps in larger experimental systems including both distillation and incubation. Reactions undergone in a heated bath are typically endothermic due to the continuous supply of heat as opposed to an exothermic reaction.

In contrast to traditional Bunsen burners, heated baths use liquids to transfer heat to the reaction vessel. This is achieved using a high-boiling point liquid inside a thermally conducting bath (usually made of metal). The influence heat added by heated baths exponentially increases the overall reaction rate of a chemical reaction. Water and silicone oil are the most commonly used fluids. A water bath is used for temperatures up to 100 °C. An oil bath is employed for temperatures above 100 °C.

The heated bath is heated on an electric hot plate, or with a Bunsen burner. The reaction vessel (Florence flask, Erlenmeyer flask, or beaker) is immersed in the heated bath. Heated baths are often used to heat flammable substances as a cautionary measure with handling. A thermometer is usually kept in the fluid to monitor the temperature. It is important not to raise the temperature of the used fluid too high as overheating of the reactants can cause unwanted bonds to break alongside risking denaturation in biochemical processes.

== See also ==
- Bain-marie, a.k.a. double boiler
- Heat bath
- Sand bath
