= Laboratory water bath =

Apparatus for incubating samples

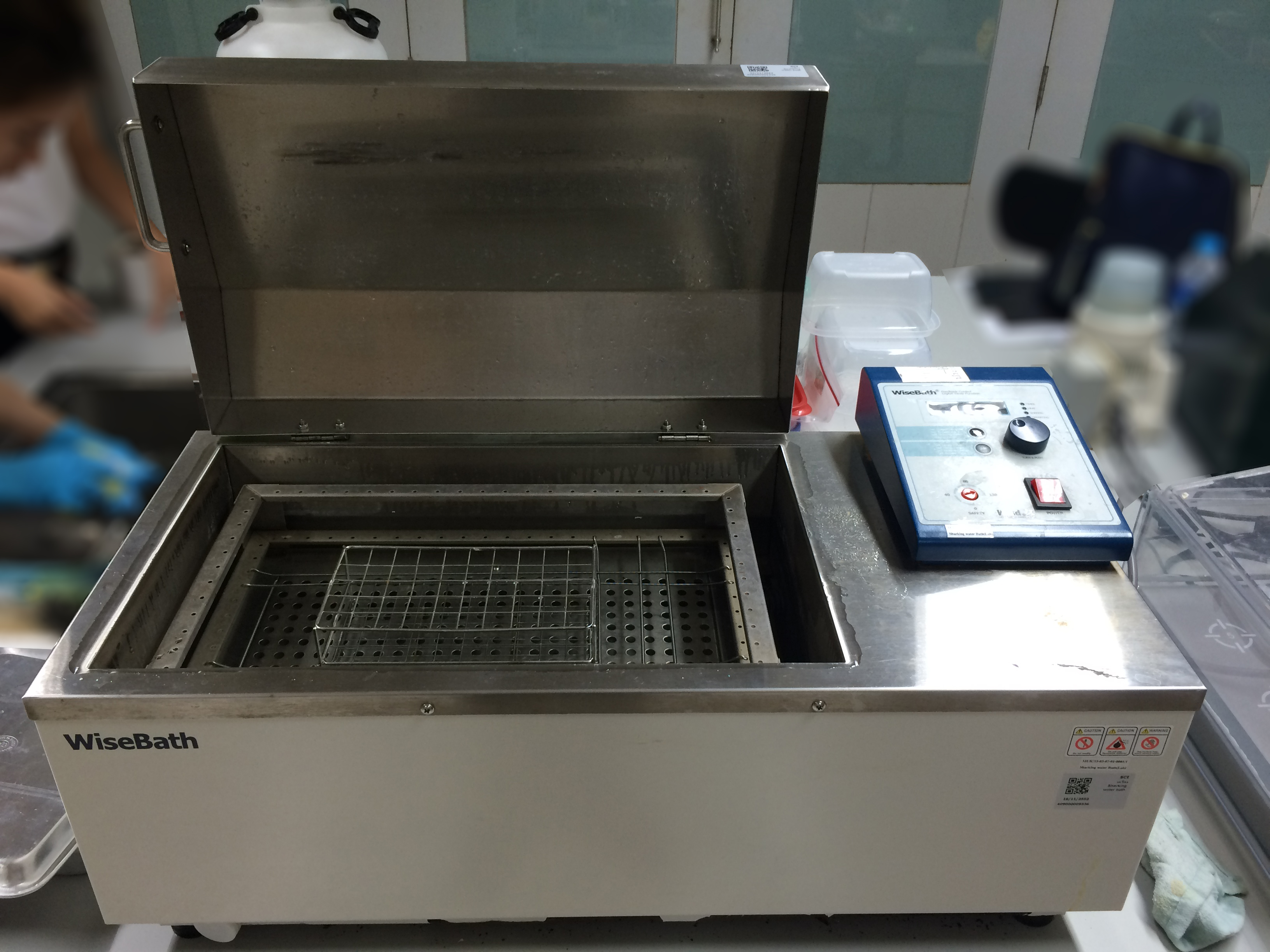
Inside a shaking water bath

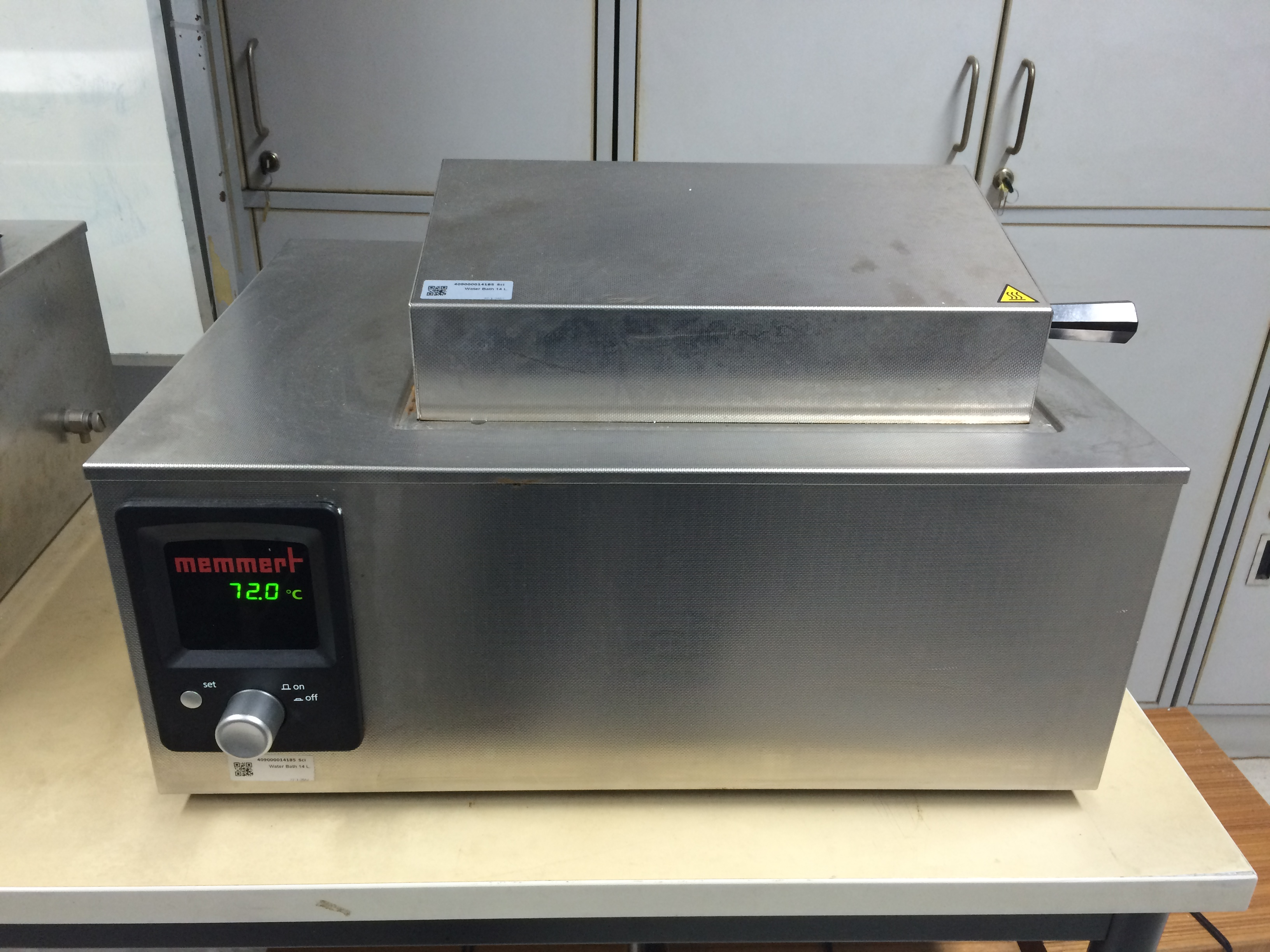
A water bath operating at 72°C

A water bath is laboratory equipment made from a container filled with heated water. It is used to incubate samples in water at a constant temperature over a long period of time. Most water baths have a digital or an analogue interface to allow users to set a desired temperature, but some water baths have their temperature controlled by a current passing through a reader.

Uses include warming of reagents, melting of substrates, determination of boiling point, or incubation of cell cultures. It is also used to enable certain chemical reactions to occur at high temperature.

Water baths are preferred heat sources for heating flammable chemicals, as their lack of open flame prevents ignition. Different types of water baths are used depending on application. For all water baths, it can be used up to 99.9 °C.

When the required temperature is above 100 °C, alternative methods such as oil bath, silicone oil bath or sand bath may be used.

== Precautions ==
It is not recommended to use water bath with moisture sensitive or pyrophoric reactions. Do not heat a bath fluid above its flash point. Water level should be regularly monitored, and filled with distilled water only. This is required to prevent salts from depositing on the heater. Disinfectants can be added to prevent growth of organisms. If application involves liquids that give off fumes, it is recommended to operate water bath in fume hood or in a well ventilated area. The cover is closed to prevent evaporation and to help reaching high temperatures.

== Types of water bath ==
A shaking water bath in action

=== Circulating water baths ===
Circulating water baths (also called stirrers ) are ideal for applications when temperature uniformity and consistency are critical, such as enzymatic and serologic experiments. Water is thoroughly circulated throughout the bath resulting in a more uniform temperature.

=== Non-circulating water baths ===
This type of water bath relies primarily on convection instead of water being uniformly heated. Therefore, it is less accurate in terms of temperature control. In addition, there are add-ons that provide stirring to non-circulating water baths to create more uniform heat transfer.

=== Shaking water baths ===
This type of water bath has extra control for shaking, which moves liquids around. This shaking feature can be turned on or off. In microbiological practices, constant shaking allows liquid-grown cell cultures grown to constantly mix with the air.

Some key benefits of shaking water bath are user-friendly operation via keypad, convenient bath drains, adjustable shaking frequencies, bright LED-display, optional lift-up bath cover, power switch integrated in keypad and warning and cut-off protection for low/high temperature.

== Water bath technologies ==
The bath is a fundamental product in any laboratory. Over the years, water baths have evolved from basic analog tools to advanced digital machines capable of sophisticated and programmable controls, functions, and capabilities.

Key features in water baths often include:

- Multi-language operation
- User-settable limit values
- "Eco modes" which save energy after set programs are completed
- User-settable alarms: audible, visible or both
- Displays of actual and/or set point temperatures
- Programmable pre-sets for frequently used temperatures
- Integrated timers
- Hinged gable covers
- Calibration off-set capabilities
- Stainless reservoirs
- Reservoir drains
- Primary and automatic safety thermostats
- Compatible with waterless alloy bath beads

== Additional images ==
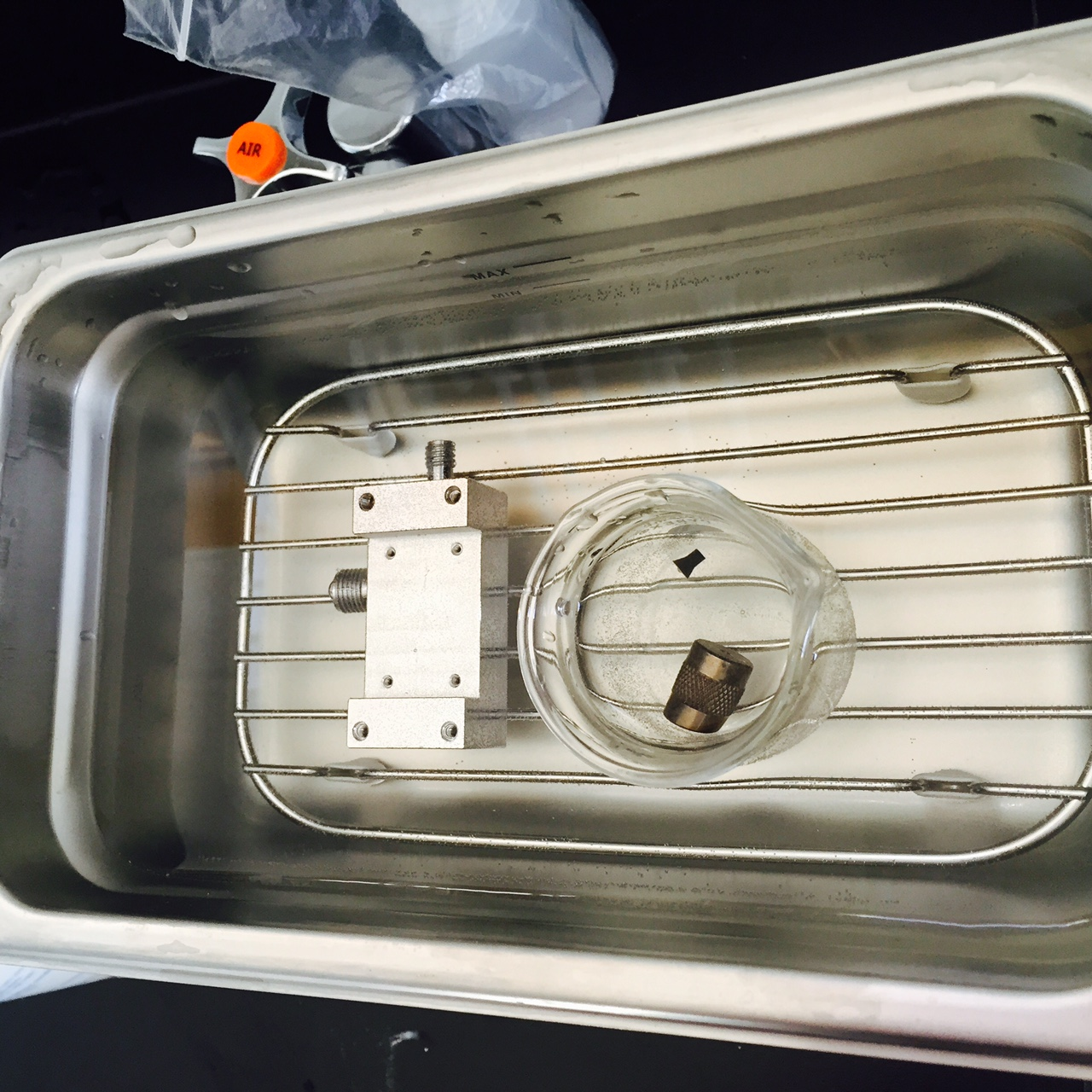
LWIA seawater cleaning methods; water bath with injector block, septum support and insert.

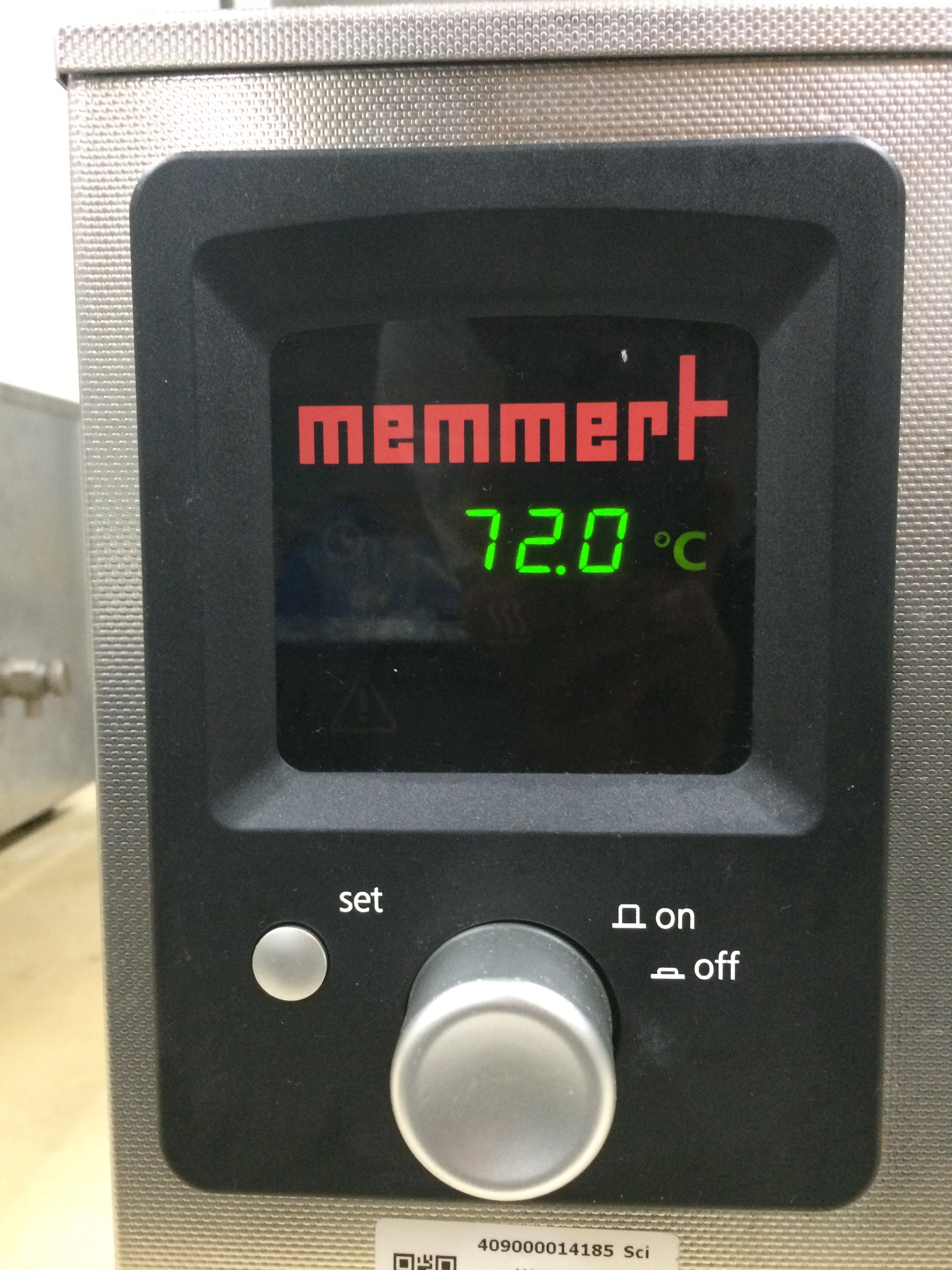
Temperature control knob of a water bath

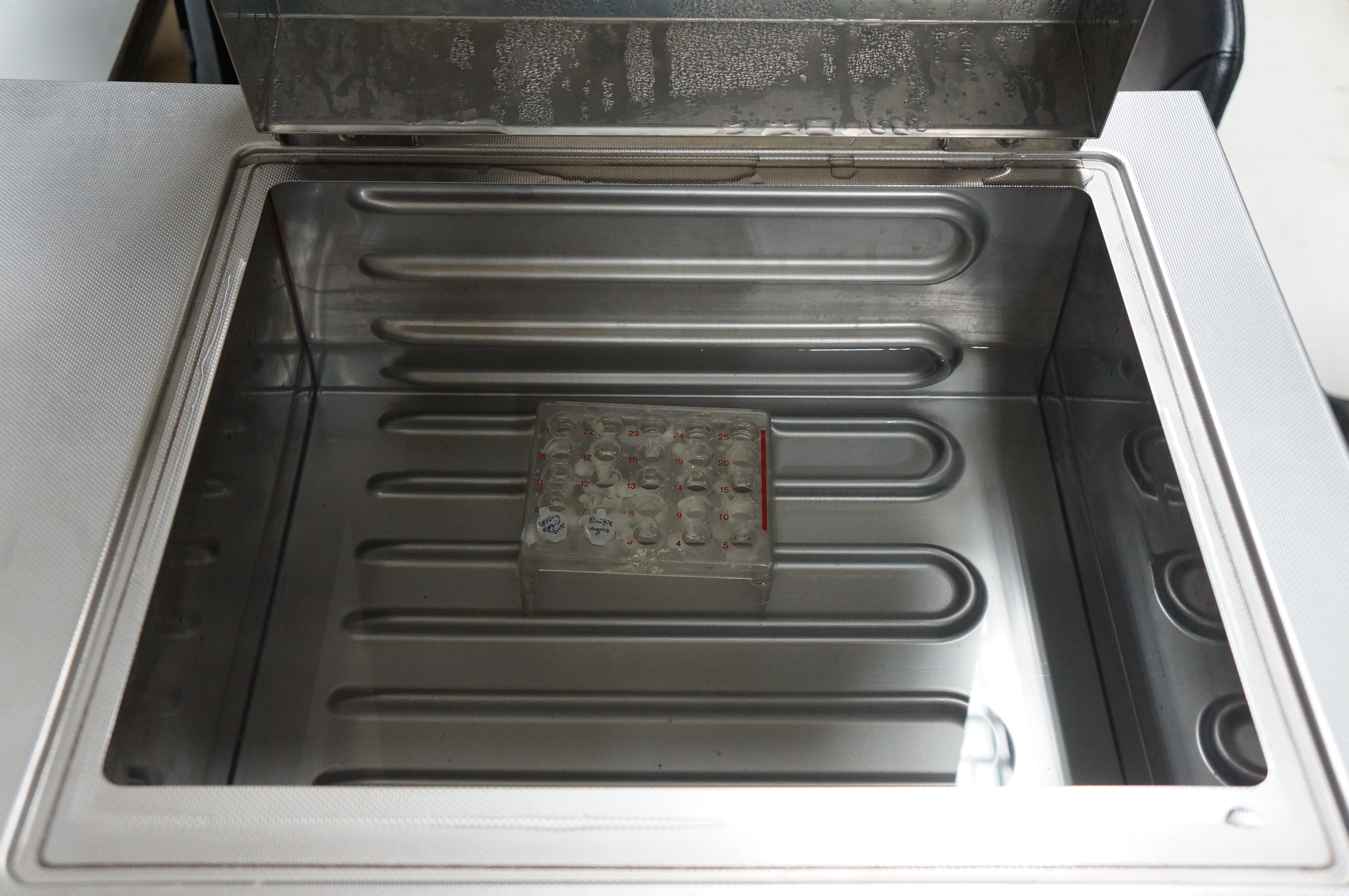
Inside water bath with micro-centrifuge rack

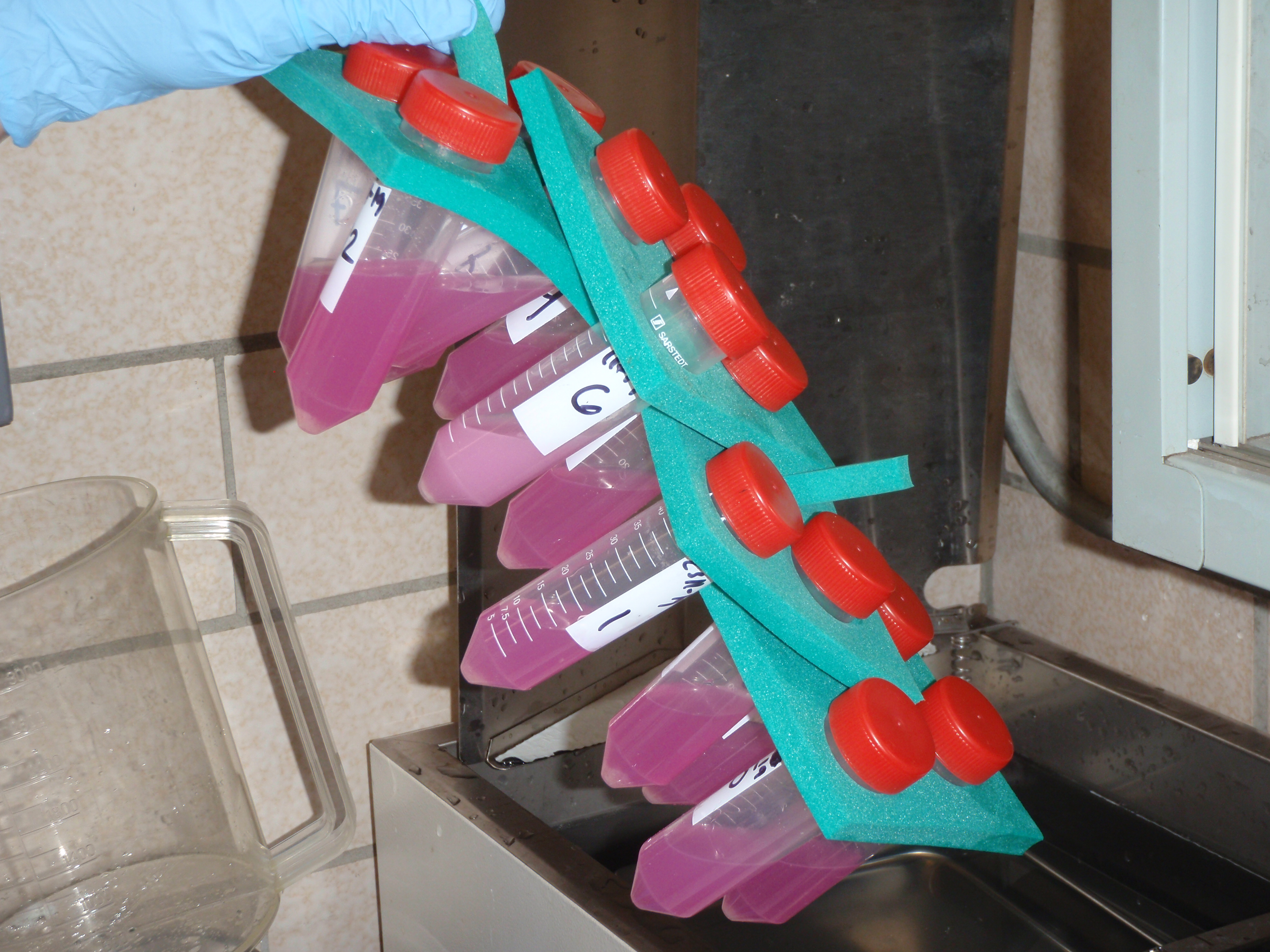
A water bath float rack.

== See also ==
- Thermal immersion circulator
- Heated bath
- Hot plate
- Sand bath
- Oil bath
