= Soaper =

Person who makes soap

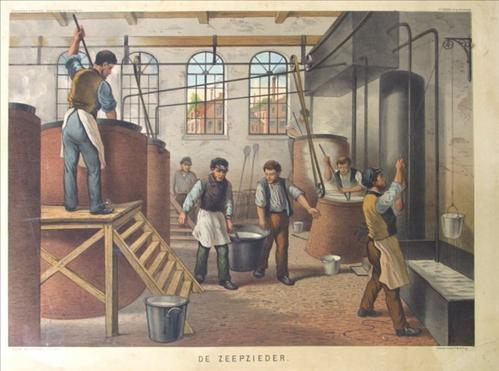
19th-century print of soapmakers

A soaper is a person who practices soap making. It is the origin of the surnames "Soper", "Soaper", and "Saboni" (Arabic for soap maker). Roads with names like "Sopers Lane," "Soper Street," and so forth often are areas where soap makers worked.

Historically in England and in the United States, a chandler is a person in the soap and/or candle trade. Soapmaking and candle-making use both similar ingredients and similar instruments.

Craft-scale soap making has a variety of adherents, both those who practice it as a hobby and to keep traditional soap making methods alive, and consumers who prefer traditional handmade products as alternatives to mass-produced industrial offerings and as a contribution to a more sustainable means of living.
