= Gauze (disambiguation) =

Gauze is a thin, translucent fabric with a loose open weave.

Gauze may also refer to:

- Gauze (band), Japanese hardcore punk band
- Gauze (album), Dir En Grey album
- Wire Gauze An item to be used with Bunsen burners
- "Gauze", song by Deftones from album Koi No Yokan
