= Meker–Fisher burner =

Ambient air laboratory burner that produces multiple open gas flames

Méker–Fisher burner
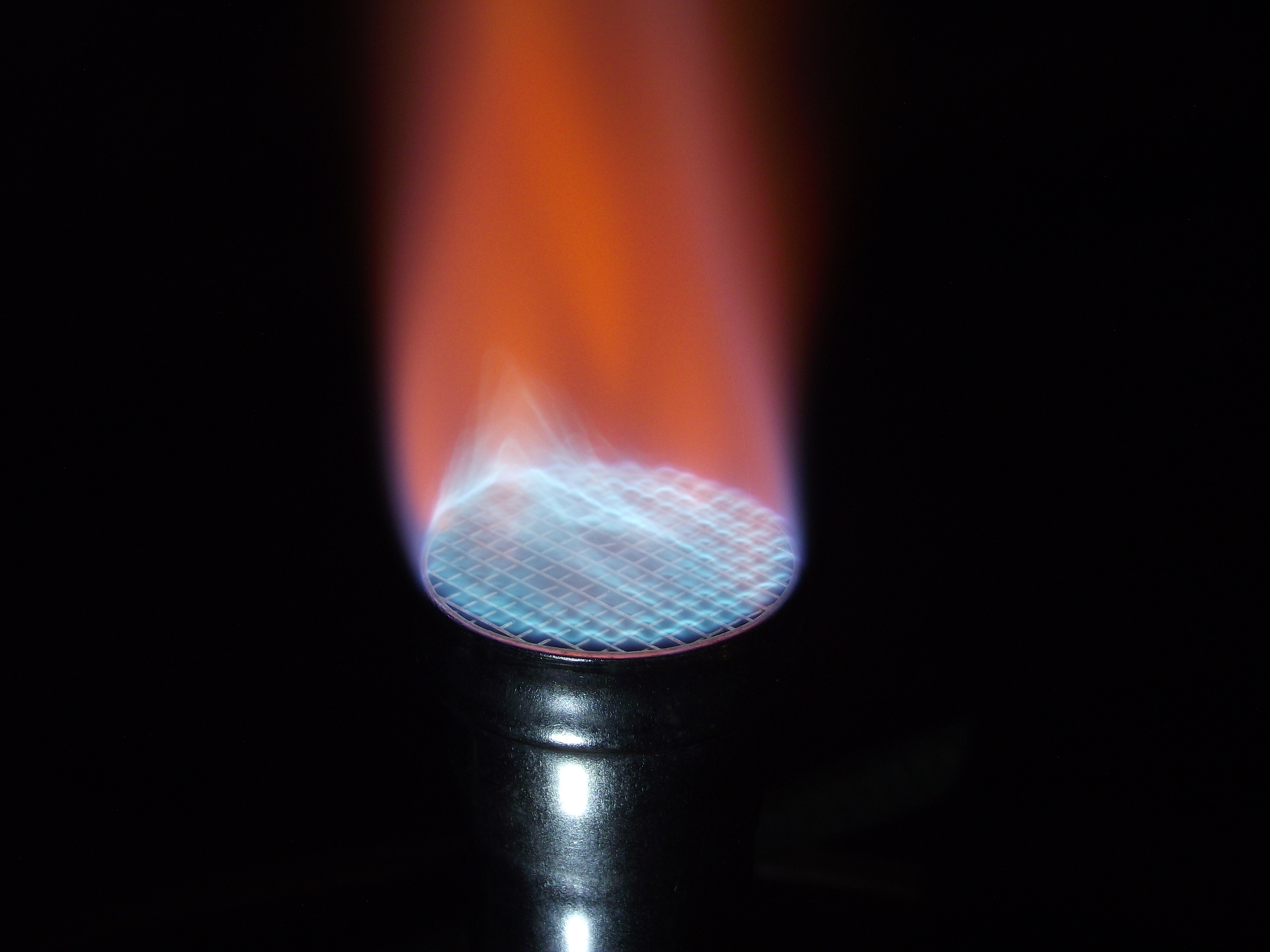
- A Méker–Fisher burner
- Uses: Heating; Sterilization; Combustion
- Inventor: French chemist Georges Méker
- Related items: Bunsen burner; Hot plate; Heating mantle

A Méker burner (sometimes named Méker–Fisher burner for its distributor in USA) is an ambient air laboratory burner that produces multiple open gas flames, used for heating, sterilization and combustion.

It is used when laboratory work requires a hotter flame than one attainable using a Bunsen burner, or when a flame of larger diameter is desired, such as when working with inoculation loop needing sterilization or in some glassblowing operations. The burner was introduced by French chemist Georges Méker in an article published in 1905.

== Heating ==
The Méker burner heating power can be around 3.6 kW using liquefied petroleum gas. Flame temperatures of up to 1,100–1,200 °C (2,000–2,200 °F) are achievable. Compared with a Bunsen burner, the lower part of its tube has more openings with larger total cross-section, admitting more air and facilitating better mixing of air and gaseous fuel. The tube is wider and its top is covered with a plate mesh, which separates the flame into an array of smaller flames with a common external envelope, ensures uniform heating, also preventing flashback to the bottom of the tube which is a risk at high air-to-fuel ratios and limits the maximal rate of air intake in a Bunsen burner. The flame burns almost without noise, unlike the Bunsen or Teclu burners.

== See also ==
- Teclu burner
