= Heatproof mat =

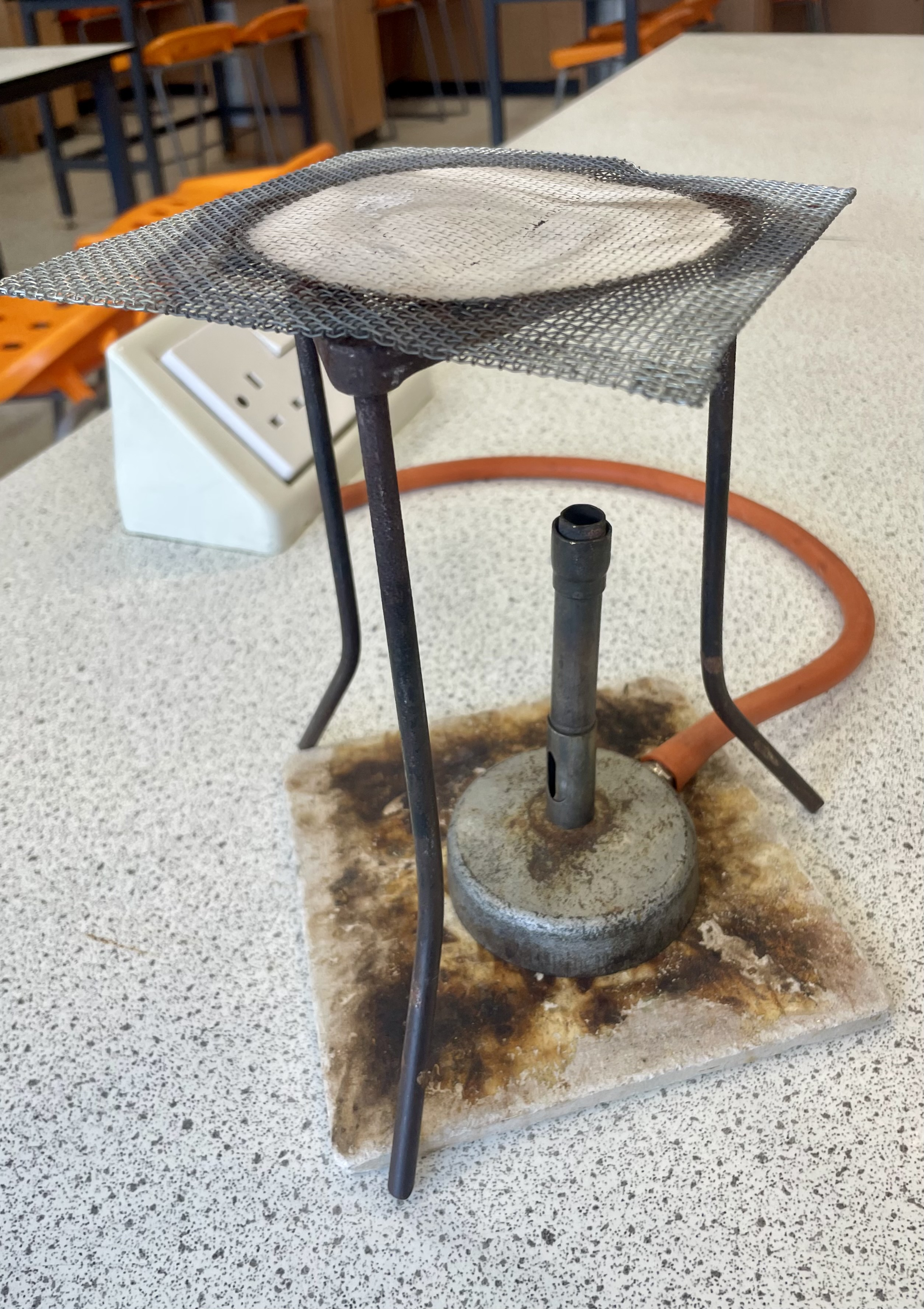
A Bunsen burner placed atop a heatproof mat (ideally a larger mat should be used to protect the worksurface from the hot tripod legs)

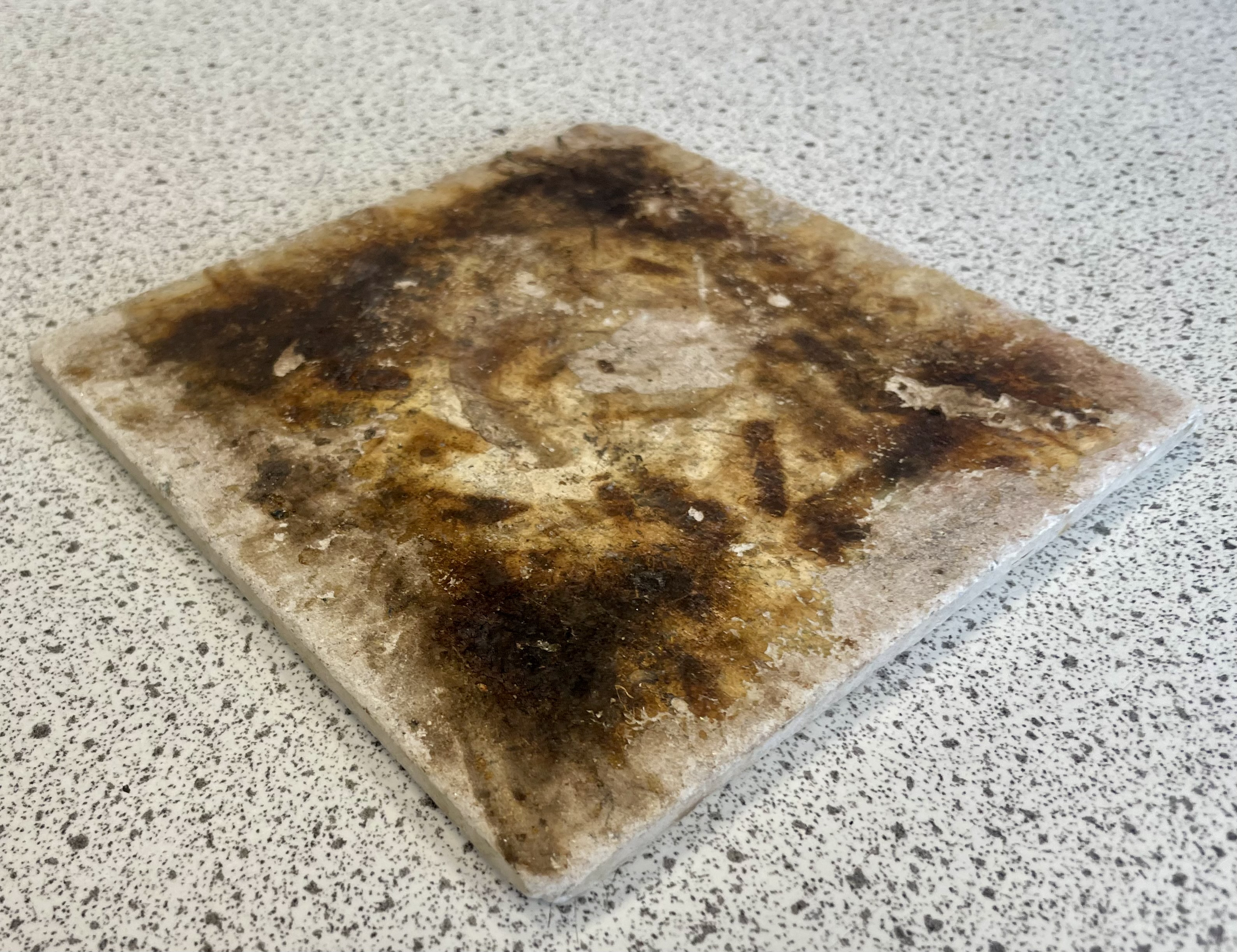
A heatproof mat

A heatproof mat is a piece of apparatus commonly used in tabletop lab experiments that involve moderate temperatures (for example, when a Bunsen burner is being used) to prevent damage to a work surface. They may also be used for domestic equipment, such as hot plates, hair stylers, hair straighteners or other hot objects.

Traditionally, such mats were made of asbestos. Fiberglass, calcium silicate or other substitutes are now used because of the toxicity of asbestos fibres.
