= Nicolae Teclu =

Romanian chemist (1839-1916)

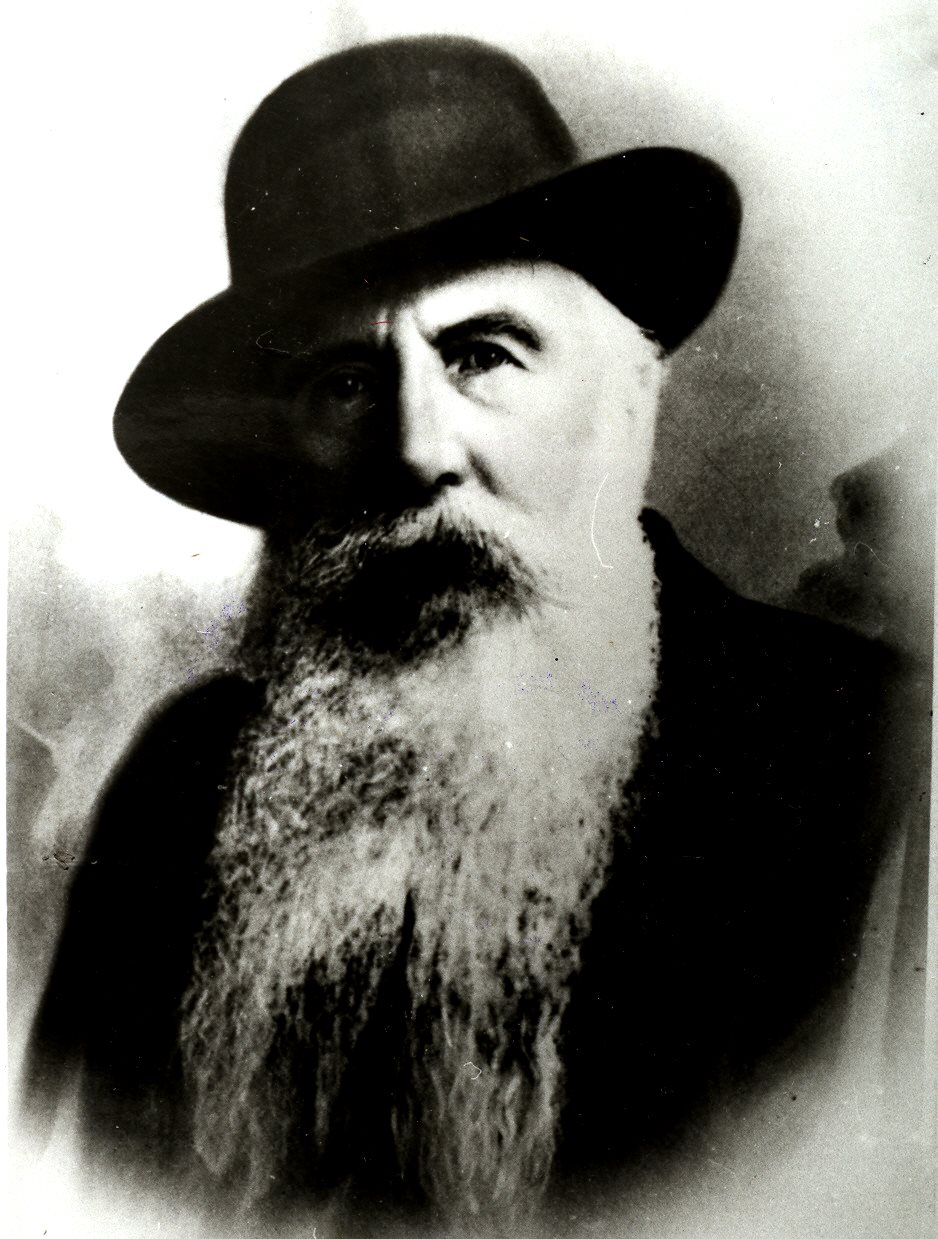
Nicolae Teclu

Nicolae Teclu (Romanian pronunciation: [nikoˈla.e ˈteklu]); (11 October 1839, Kronstadt, Austrian Empire (today Brașov, Romania) – 13 July 1916, Vienna, Austria-Hungary) was a Romanian chemist, who gave his name to the worldwide-used "Teclu burner". He studied engineering and architecture, and then chemistry, continuing his career by becoming professor for general and analytical chemistry in Vienna. He also contributed substantially to the worldwide development of chemistry.

== Biography ==
He studied chemistry at the Vienna Polytechnic Institute and later changed to architecture at the Academy of Fine Arts in Munich. After a short time in Romania he went back to Vienna becoming a professor for general and analytical chemistry in Vienna. In 1892 he published his invention of the gas burner with a mechanism to control the respective amounts of methane gas and air.

His burner produces a hotter flame than the Bunsen Burner, thus making it superior. The usage of Teclu burners is very common not only in Romania, but also in many other parts of the world.

His domains of study included:

- The resistance of paper and wood fibers
- Mineral pigments
- Oils utilized in paintings
- Combustion of gases (alkanes)

He was also the inventor of several other laboratory items, kept now at the University of Bucharest. Among these items is a tool for the detection of methane gas, and another one for the preparation of ozone.

He was elected to the Romanian Academy.

== Links ==
- Nicolae Teclu - Gallery of personalities - Virtual Museum of Science and Technology in Romania
