= Pipeclay triangle =

Fireproof support; laboratory equipment

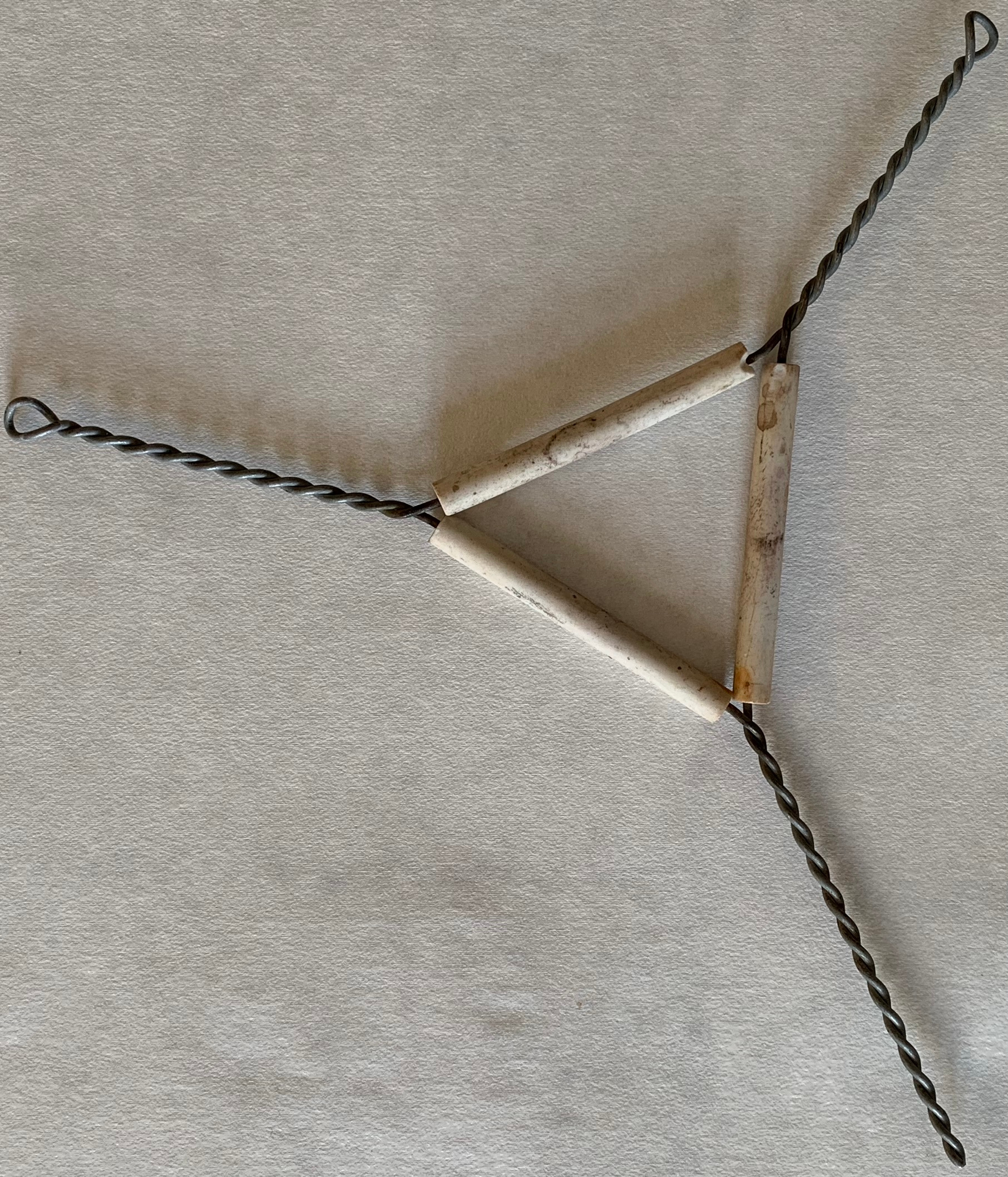
- Other names: Pipestem triangle
- Related items: Wire gauze

A pipeclay triangle is a piece of laboratory apparatus that is used to support a crucible or other object being heated by a Bunsen burner or other heat source. It is made of wires strung in an equilateral triangle on which are strung hollow ceramic, normally fire clay, tubes. The triangle is usually supported on a tripod or iron ring. Unlike wire gauze, which primarily supports glassware such as beakers, flasks, or evaporating dishes and provides indirect heat transfer to the glassware, the pipeclay triangle normally supports a crucible and allows the flame to heat the crucible directly. The triangular shape allows rounded crucibles of various sizes to rest in a stable way.
