= Teclu burner =

Variant of the Bunsen burner

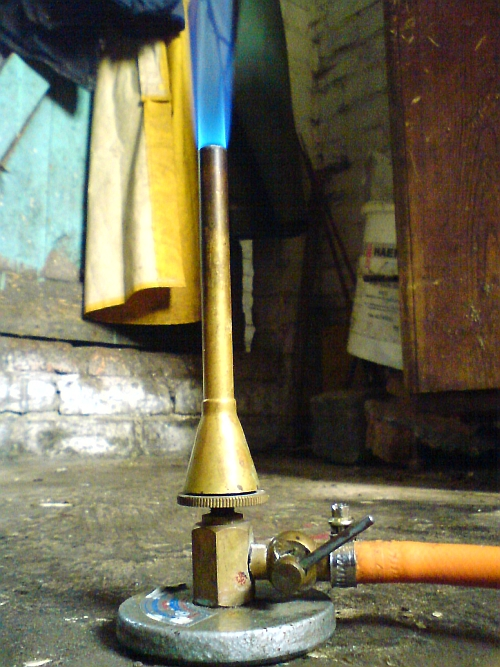
- A Teclu burner
- Uses: Heating; Sterilization; Soldering
- Inventor: Nicolae Teclu
- Material: Brass or iron
- Related items: Bunsen burner; Hot plate; Heating mantle; Meker-Fisher burner

The Teclu burner is an ambient air laboratory gas burner, that was created by Romanian chemist Nicolae Teclu in 1882. The burner is most commonly used to heat substances in a laboratory, can be used for sterilisation and sometimes it is used for soldering or glasswork. It is commonly made from brass or iron.The burner physically consists of a round base, a tube connected to it providing the gas to the flame and a vertical metal tube that directs the flame upwards. The tube has a conical shape closer to the base.

The burner was created on the basis of Nicolae Teclu's previous studies on flame spectroscopy and specifically, his experiments including flames positioned at different levels in a tube. Teclu was able to conclude that changing the position of the flame in a vertical tube can affect the splitting of the flame and optimize the heat produced by the flame. As a result of this alteration, this burner compared with the Bunsen burner is able to produce higher flame temperatures: around 2,900 °F (1,600 °C; 1,850 K). The research behind the creation of this burner was first published in 1892. There are some early Teclu burners on display in the Virtual Gas Museum in Poland and also in the Science Museum, London.

== Physical components and uses ==
The Teclu burner is a gas burner that is used most often as piece of laboratory equipment for experimental and educational purposes. The Teclu burner is most commonly used for rapidly heating substances using an open flame. While the Teclu burner's primary function is to serve as a piece of equipment that is used in a laboratory, the Teclu burner can also be used for glasswork and even used for soldering. The Teclu Burner can produce a very hot flame of around 2,900 °F (1,600 °C). It is commonly made out of brass or iron. The burner consists on a round base, a tube connected to it providing the flame with gas and a vertical metal tube that directs the flame upwards. The tube has a conical shape closer to the base. The tube dimensions range between 125 and 165 mm (4.9 and 6.5 in) in height and between 13 and 17 mm (0.5 and 0.7 in) in diameter. It is designed with a screwed air valve which can be tightened or loosened for gas regulation. The structure of this device is more simple than other burners, because in the Teclu burner the inner flame is able to be lifted and placed on top of the tube, with its tip pointing upward. This allows for a single flame to be produced out of the tube.

== History and creation ==
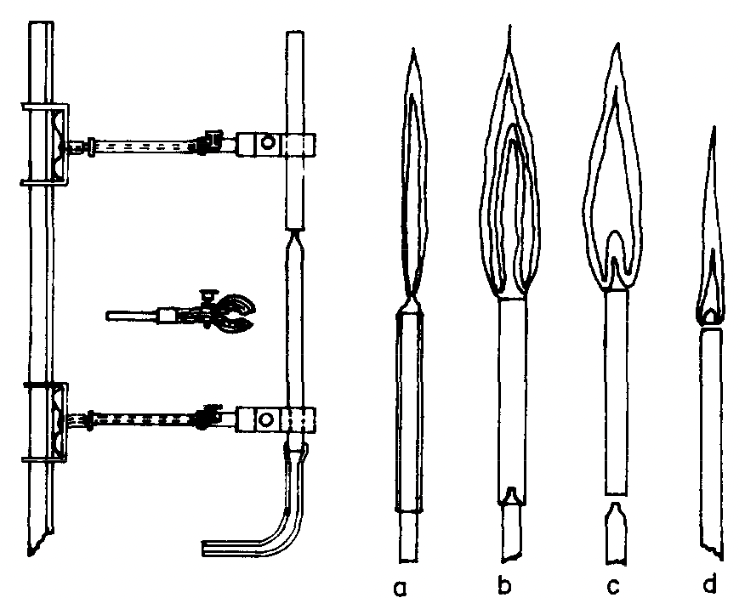
Flame study conducted by Nicolae Teclu

The inventor of the Teclu burner is the Romanian chemist Nicolae Teclu. Teclu is most commonly known for his studies of flames. Teclu was born in Braşov, Romania on 7 October 1839 and graduated from high school in Vienna. After graduation with a Bachelor of Science in Munich, he returned to Vienna and attended chemistry classes at the Academy of Fine Arts in Vienna. He began his career as a young scientist and assisted Professor Ernest Ludwig. Soon after, he became Professor of Chemistry at the Technical Chemistry Department of the Vienna Trade Academy. He also presented academic lectures on the chemistry of colours at the Academy of Fine Arts. Other notable investigations Teclu was involved in were the burning process of combustible gases, the analysis of natural products and also studies on the composition of paper.

Teclu was also constantly occupied with creating and investigating new and more advanced laboratory equipment. The Teclu Burner was created on the basis Teclu's studies and tests investigating the combustion rate of a gaseous mixture in regards to its oxygen content. Teclu conducted an experiment where he compared the flames that were produced when moving the position of a flame in a vertical tube. From this experiment he came to the conclusion that a flame is split into different parts while it is burning- one flame burning on the inside of the tube and one flame burning on the outside of the tube. He described the flame on the inside as very hot, with a green hue that points in a downward direction and is being supplied oxygen that is contained in the gaseous mixture. He noted that the flame on the outside has a blue hue, points in an upward direction and is supplied with oxygen from its surroundings. Using this conclusion and his prior knowledge and research on flames, Teclu successfully created a burner in 1882 where the flame in the tube was able to be lowered or lifted to create a very hot flame.

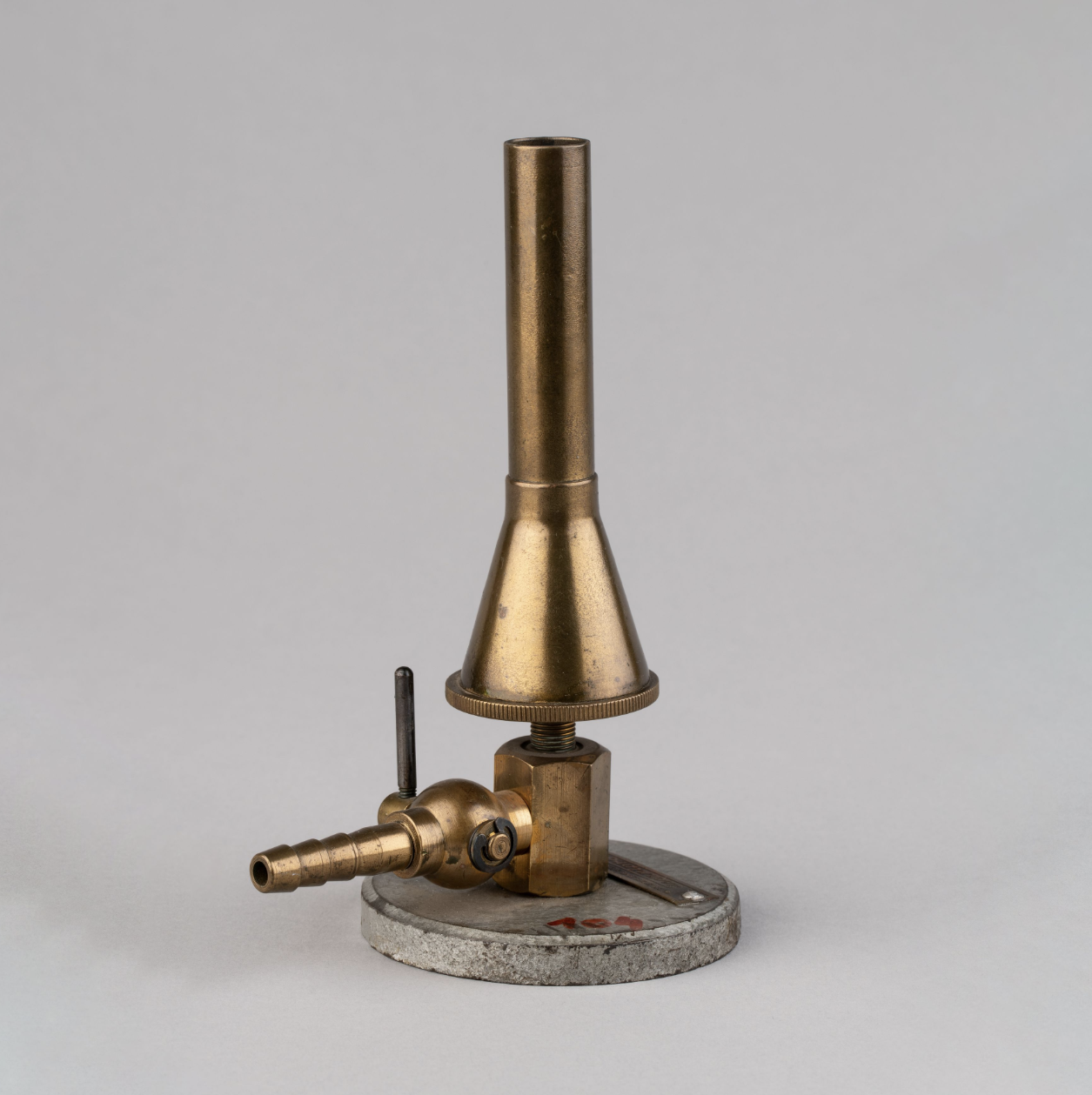
Teclu burner in the Virtual Gas Museum in Poland

The first publication of his research behind the creation of the Teclu burner was 10 years later, in 1892 and the publication was titled “Ein neuer Laboratoriums Brenner". This article was issued in the Für Praktische Chemie Journal. The original burner was patented by a company owned by W. J. Rohrbeck Nachfolger which was based in Vienna and a company owned by Franz Hugershoff which was based in Leipzig. A Teclu Burner that was manufactured in the 1960s is currently on display in the Gasworks Museum in Paczkow, Poland. It is made from cast iron and brass and it was admitted to the museum in 1998. Other early makes of the Teclu burner are displayed in the Science Museum in London. Here there are two models of the Teclu burner displayed, one whole and one that has been cross sectioned to examine the inside parts of the burner.

== Examples of the Teclu Burner in past experiments ==
The Teclu Burner can be helpful in experiments where moisture sensitive compounds are being used. An example where the Teclu burner was used in an experiment was during the preparation of glassware for the handling of beryllium compounds. Beryllium is moisture sensitive and so it is necessary to exclude the presence of water that might be still left on the surface of the glassware after cleaning them. The experiment conductors stored the glassware for at least four hours in a heated cabinet, which was kept at 130–160 °C (270–320 °F). Then the glassware removed and connected to a Schlenk line. The glassware was heated with a Teclu burner under vacuum up until the flame of the burner turned to a yellow/orange colour. At this point, the glassware was hot enough and was then cooled to room temperature while still being under vacuum. This procedure was repeated several times, to ensure no moisture was left on the glassware. Using a Teclu burner instead of a heat gun will ensure that the lowest possible moisture levels have been obtained in glass laboratory equipment. This should be sufficient for moisture-sensitive substances to not react when added into the glassware.

The Teclu burner was used in an experiment investigating the effect of the process on the crucible swelling number of coal (CSN). The number is a measure of the degree of swelling of the sample. A sample of 1g of freshly ground minus 72 "B.S. mesh coal" was heated using a Teclu burner to approximately 800 °C (1,470 °F) for 1.5 minutes and to 820 °C (1,510 °F) in the next minute. The final result was recorded and coal with a profile of 8 to 9 would be considered high coal quality.

The Teclu burner was also used in an experiment which aimed to investigate the spark formation from rare earth elements. The powders containing the rare earth elements were passed into the centre of the gas flame produced by the Teclu burner and the sparks were then examined. The Teclu burner was operated with methane through an aluminium tube from a distance of 20 cm (8 in). These sparks were then examined using time-resolved emission spectroscopy, long-time exposures, and NIR (Near-infrared spectroscopy)/ MIR (mid-Infrared spectroscopy) imaging.

== Similarities and differences to other notable burners ==
The Teclu burner vs. the Bunsen burner:

The Teclu Burner was invented in 1882 as opposed to the Bunsen Burner invented in 1855. The respective developers Nicolae Teclu, a Romanian chemist, and Robert Bunsen, a German chemist, also differed in their educational backgrounds as Teclu specialised in engineering, architecture, and chemistry while Bunsen primarily studied chemistry, mineralogy, and mathematics. The devices themselves differ in their abilities to accurately control the amounts of methane gas and air inputted into the tube therefore contributing to a hotter flame able to be achieved by the Teclu Burner. While the Bunsen burner has open slots on the side of the tube, the Teclu Burner regulates the air and gas input through the distance between the screw below the base of the tube and the end of the tube itself. This change in design also allows for greater mixing of methane gas and air which in turn produces higher temperatures as seen in the Teclu Burner. More specifically, the Teclu Burner can reach approximately 2,900 °F (1,600 °C) while the Bunsen Burner achieves only 2,000 °F (1,100 °C). Both the Bunsen and Teclu burner burn with noise.

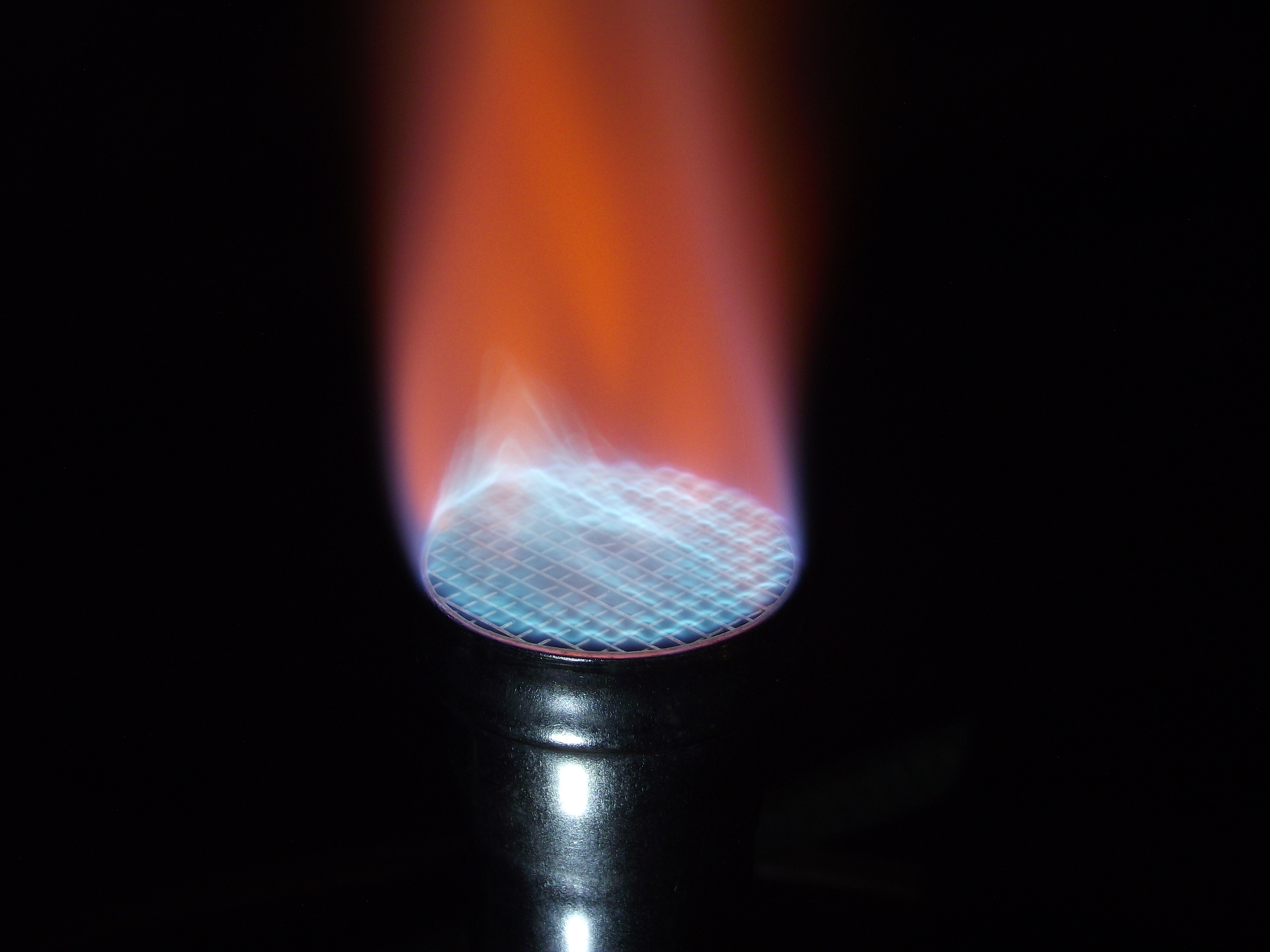
Meker-Fisher burner 001

The Teclu burner vs. the Meker burner:

The Meker Burner differs in that it is designed with more openings in the lower part of the tube than the Teclu Burner and has a wire grid covering the top of the tube allowing the flame to be divided into smaller flames. This allows for temperatures to reach 2,200 °F (1,200 °C) and this allows the device to burn without noise unlike the Teclu and Bunsen burners. The Meker Burner has a wider tube than the Teclu Burner.

The Teclu burner vs. the Tirril Burner:

The Tirril burner has a needle valve to regulate the gas intake directly unlike the Teclu burner which regulates gas directly from the gas source. Additionally, the Tirrill Burner differs in that it reaches around 2,800 °F (1,550 °C) and the Teclu burner reaches 2,900 °F (1,600 °C).

The Teclu burner vs. the Amal burner:

The Amal burner is a burner created by the modification of the Bunsen and Teclu burner. The Amal burner was marketed by Messrs. Amal Ltd., of Birmingham. In this burner, a needle valve is inserted in the orifice of the jet to sensitively control the gas flow into the burner by an external screw. The flame produced can be reduced to near invisibility. This burner's combustion head is perforated with many small holes, so that the flame the burner produces consists of many aerated small cones whereas in the Teclu burner, only one single flame is produced. There is an insulated hooked strip of metal attached to the base that functions as a holder for when the burner itself becomes too hot to handle. The Amal burner is usually 5 inches high and its tube has approximately a 1 inch diameter.
