= Clamp stand =

Scientific equipment

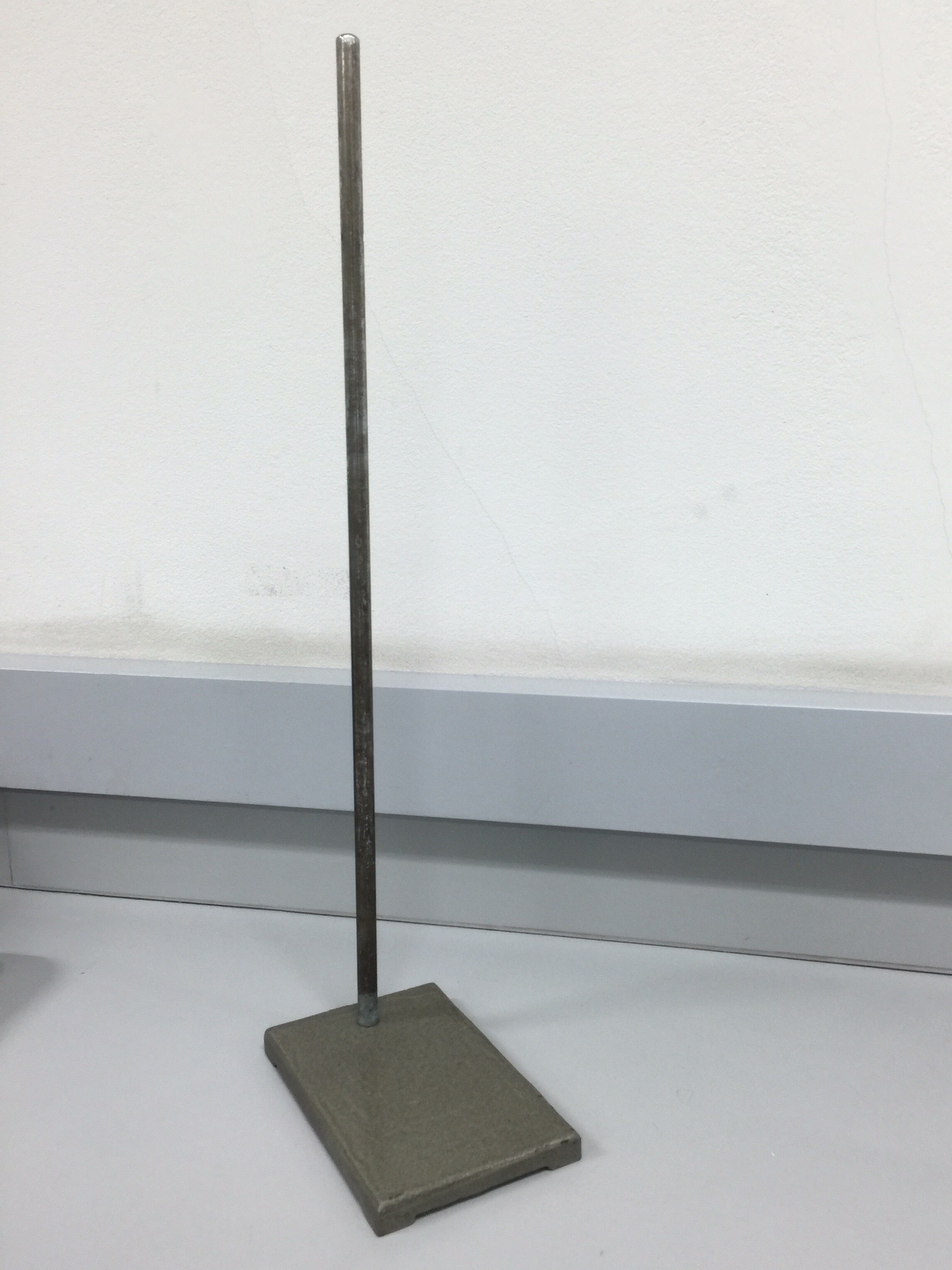
A standard retort stand, without any clamps attached

In chemistry, a clamp stand, also called a retort stand, a ring stand, or a support stand, is a piece of scientific equipment intended to support other pieces of equipment and glassware — for instance, burettes, test tubes and flasks.

The typical clamp stand consists of a heavy base and a vertical rod, both usually made of metal. A number of accessories, such as clamps of various types, can be attached to the rod by clamp holders, at whatever heights and orientations are necessary to support the target equipment. They typically include utility clamps and burette clamps, as well as iron rings.

== Structure and uses ==
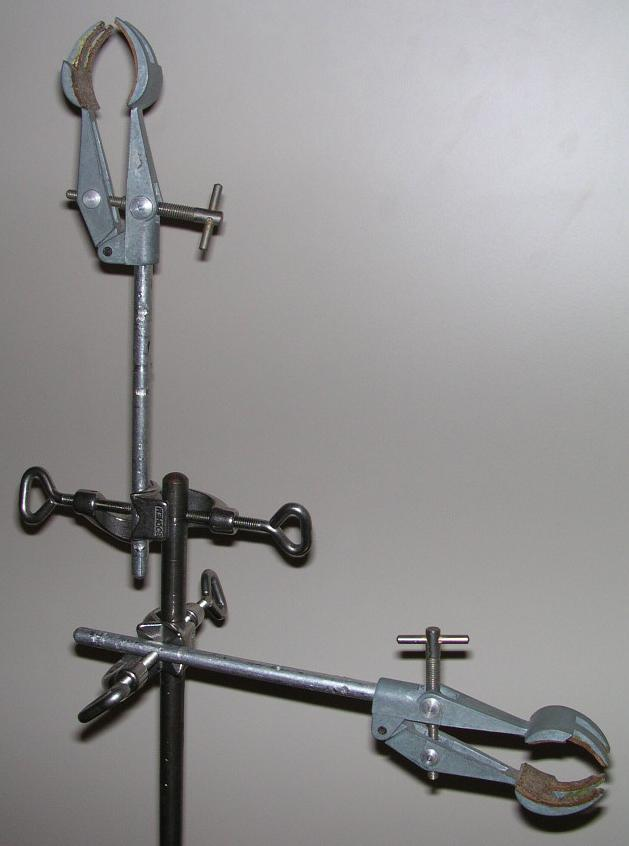
Using a clamp holder to hold clamps at different angles

Clamp stands commonly have a cast iron base of around 200 x 125 mm. The rod may be up to 750 mm and screws into a female thread in the base. The height of the rod is sufficient for most experiments and usually fits within fume hoods and glove boxes. If a taller rod is required, the solid base is usually replaced by a tripod for stability when supporting larger apparatuses, such as extremely large tubes, bulk chemical bottles etc. The height can be adjusted by moving the attached point of the given clamp to the stand. The base lowers the centre of gravity of the stand, thus increasing stability.

Clamp stands are often used in the chemistry laboratory. For instance, they are used for distillation experiments (such as organic distillations) and titrations (where they hold a burette). They are also used as supports in filtration.

== Clamp holder ==
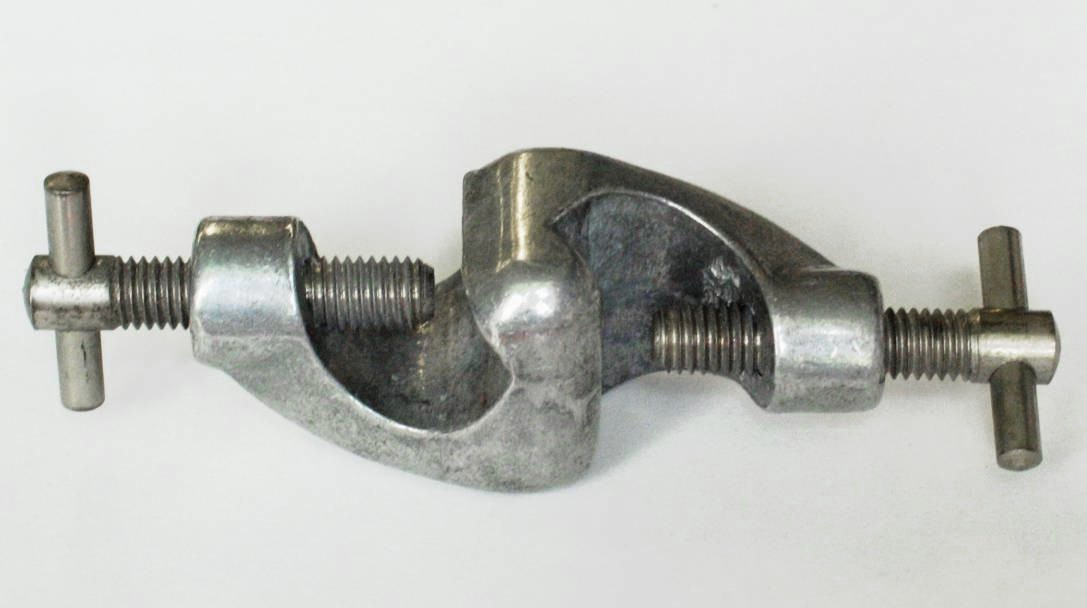
Boss Head Right Angle Clamp Holder

A clamp holder or clamp fastener is a piece of laboratory apparatus that is used to secure laboratory clamps, such as extension-type utility clamps, or other attachments to a clamp stand or lab frame. The material can be made up of brass, cast iron, stainless steel, aluminium or nickel-plated zinc.

A clamp stand rod and clamp are inserted into two jaws of a clamp holder and adjustable thumbscrews fasten the clamp holder to the attachments and lock it in place. The attachments can be secured with the thumbscrews to be positioned at any height or angle, with a regular clamp holder positioning the apparatus at a 90° angle.

Clamp holders can secure laboratory equipment at specific angles, diameters, and weights, as required. Clamp holders are often used to hold the attached apparatus over a work surface. There are several different types of holders, such as swivel holders and all-position holders, that allow adjustments for different angles and planes. In some cases it can be used to attach support rods together.

== Utility clamp ==
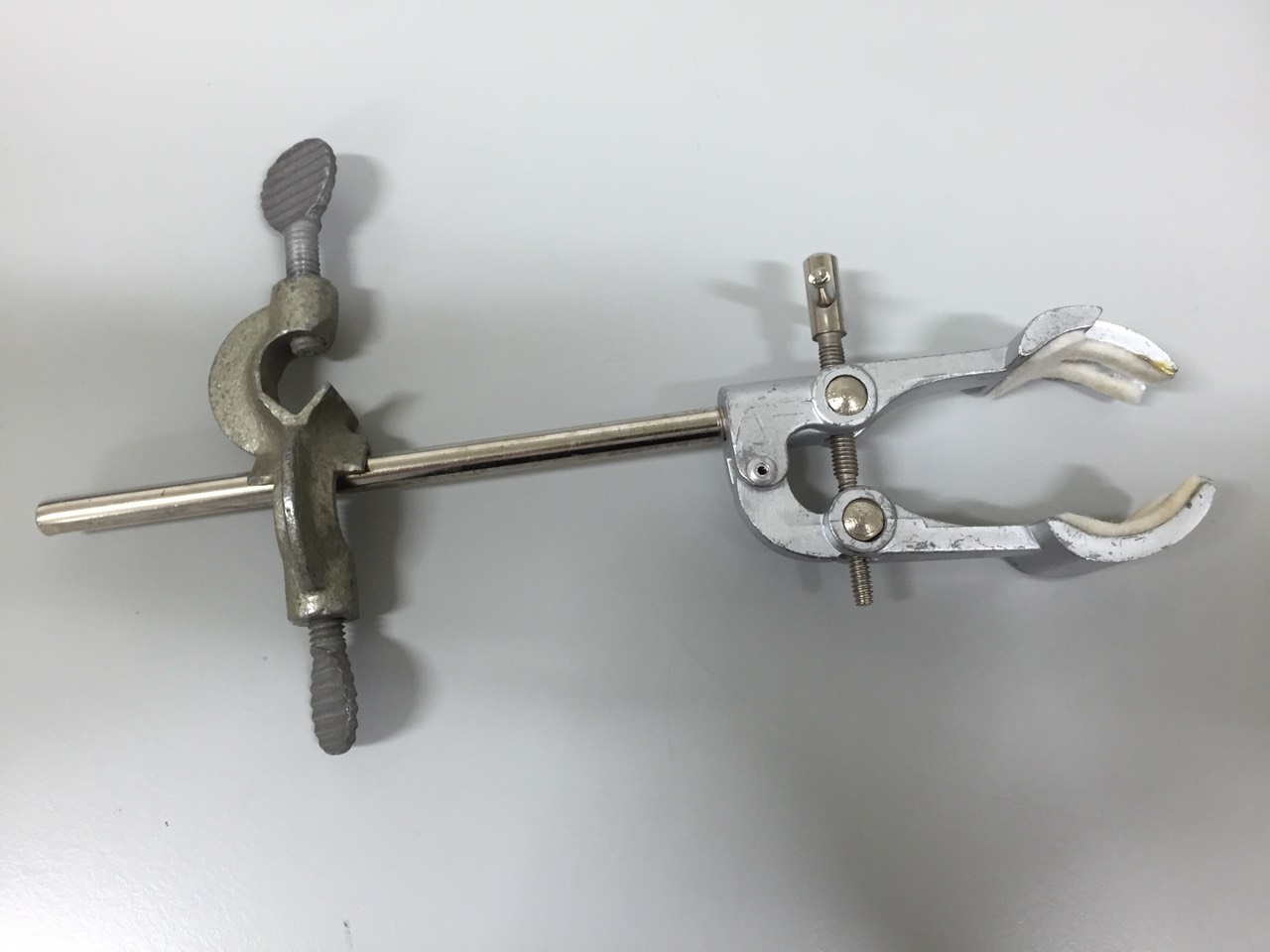
Top view of 2-prong utility clamp

A utility clamp is a laboratory apparatus resembling a pair of scissors. The screw in the middle works as the wide adjustment of 2-prong. It is composed of 3 parts: 2-prong adjust, metal rod, and clamp down (the clamp is attached to the ring stand for adjusting the height). This apparatus is connected to a ring stand or retort stand. It is used to hold round laboratory glassware, such as beakers, and flasks, etc. This type of clamp is made from stainless steel.

== Burette clamp ==
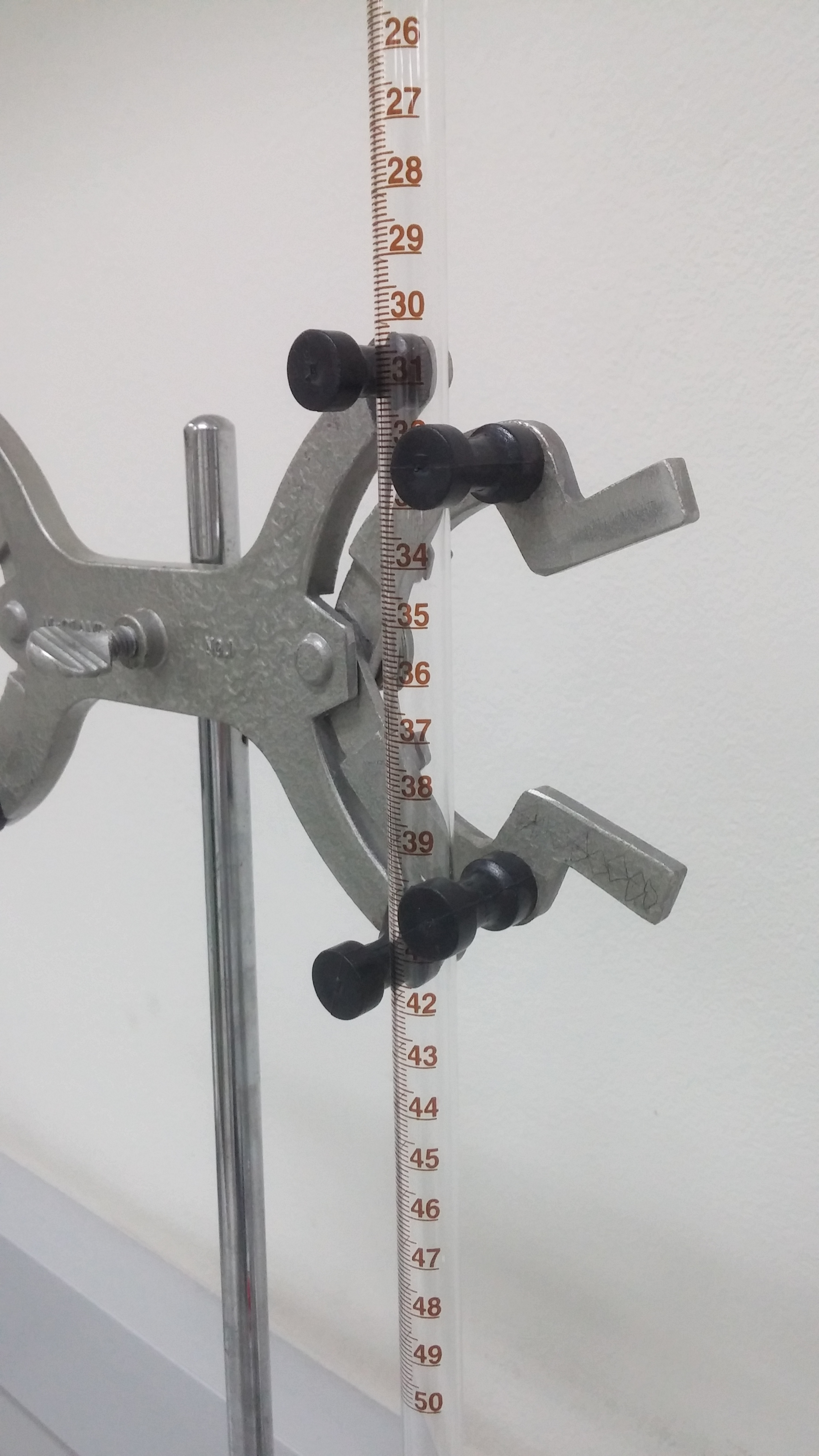
Close view of burette with clamp

A burette clamp is a type of clamp used specifically to hold and secure a burette on a stand, so that it is fixed for more convenient use. Burette clamps can be made with many materials such as plastic and cast iron. However, an iron clamp with a rubber knob to hold the burette are usually more durable. Usually burette clamps come in doubles, which means they can hold two burettes.

Burettes can be held by varying methods, some including the ones suggested below. To use a burette clamp, you should fix the burette clamp on a stand, squeeze the handle, and the rubber knobs will separate from each other. The burette will then be put between the rubber knobs. The rubber knobs are typically soft and sticky due to properties of rubber, so the burettes are not likely to break or slip during the experiment.

== Iron ring ==
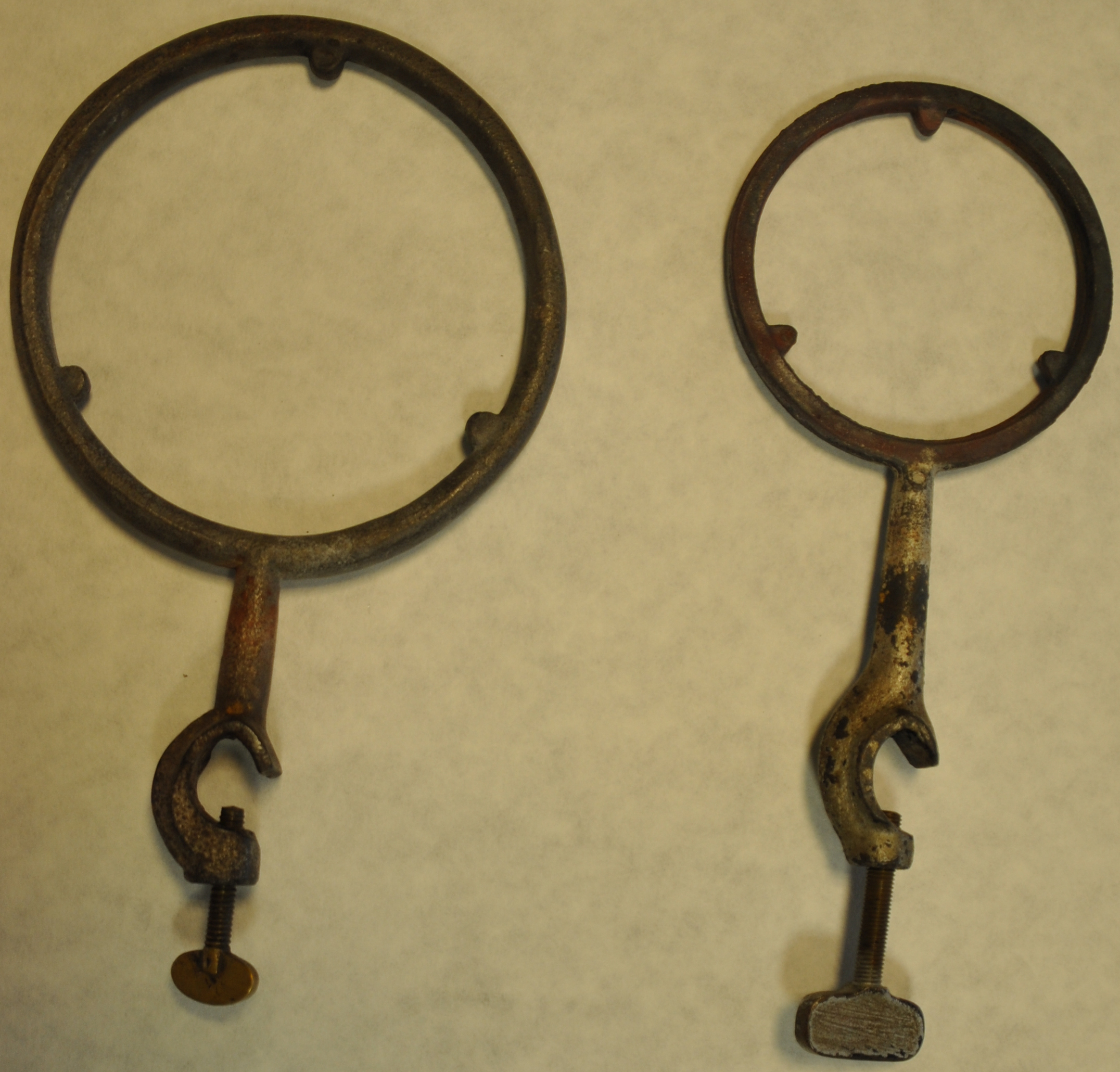
Iron rings used in a laboratory

An iron ring or ring clamp is an item of laboratory equipment which comprises a conjoined metal ring and radially-extending rod. In some cases, the rod terminates in a screw clamp for attachment to a retort stand or other support; in others, the rod may be attached to a stand by means of a laboratory clamp holder. Iron rings are commonly used in chemistry laboratories for supporting apparatus above the work surface, for example:

- a tapered item such as a filter funnel or separatory funnel.
- a clay triangle, which itself supports an item such as a crucible.
- a wire gauze, which itself supports a flat-bottomed beaker or conical flask.
- a large, and therefore heavy, round-bottom flask.

In some cases, a slot is cut in the side of the ring opposite the rod. This is to allow a funnel to be placed upon and removed from the ring from the side rather than from above, a safer procedure.
