= Georg Lockemann =

German chemist (1871-1959)

Georg Lockemann (17 October 1871, in Hollenstedt – 4 December 1959, in Hollenstedt) was a German chemist.

== Biography ==
He studied chemistry at the Technical University of Hannover and at the University of Heidelberg, receiving his doctorate in 1896 with a dissertation-thesis on azobenzene derivatives. In 1901 he became a teaching assistant to Ernst Otto Beckmann at the University of Leipzig, where in 1904 he obtained his habilitation with a thesis on studies of acrolein and phenylhydrazine. In 1907 he was named head of the chemistry department at the Robert Koch Institute in Berlin, where he worked up until his retirement in 1937. In 1939 he was re-instated to his former position, and remained at the institute until 1945.

In 1909 he obtained a new habilitation, this time at the Agricultural University of Berlin, where he submitted a thesis dealing with improvements of the Marsh test for the detection of arsenic . While employed at the Robert Koch Institute, he also taught classes on the history of chemistry and pharmacy at the University of Berlin (1921–45). In 1946-48 he continued work as an instructor at the University of Göttingen.

In addition to making improvements to the Marsh test, he developed methods for detecting cyanogens in mixtures and devised an apparatus for formaldehyde determination. In the 1950s he published a two-part work on the history of chemistry, "Geschichte der Chemie in kurzgefaßter Darstellung", that was later translated into English ("The Story of Chemistry", 1959). He was also the author of biographies on Henry Cavendish, Joseph Priestley, Carl Wilhelm Scheele and Hermann Kolbe that were included in Günther Bugge's "Buch der großen Chemiker ". In 1949 he published an extensive biography on Robert Wilhelm Bunsen, titled "Lebensbild eines deutschen Naturforschers".

== Additional works ==
- I. Über die Akroleïndarstellung nach dem Borsäureverfahren und Beiträge zur Kenntnis des Aethylidenphenylhydrazins. II. Über den Arsennachweis mit dem Marsh'schen Apparate und die katalytische Zersetzung von Arsenwasserstoff, 1904 – On acrolein representation according to the boric acid method and contributions to the knowledge of ethylidene phenylhydrazines. On arsenic detection by Marsh's apparatus and the catalytic decomposition of arsine.
- Die Entwicklung und der gegenwärtige Stand der Atomtheorie, in Umrissen, 1905 – The development and the current state of the atomic theory in outline.
- Einführung in die analytische Chemie, 1907 – Introduction to analytical chemistry.
- Die Beziehungen der Chemie zur Biologie und Medizin, 1909 – The relationship of chemistry to biology and medicine.
- Ernst Beckmann (1853-1923) sein leben und wirken dargestellt, 1927 – Ernst Otto Beckmann, his life and work.
- Dritter Bericht über die Erforschung der Haffkrankheit, 1930 – Third report on the investigation of Haff disease.
