= Robert Bunsen =

German chemist (1811–1899)

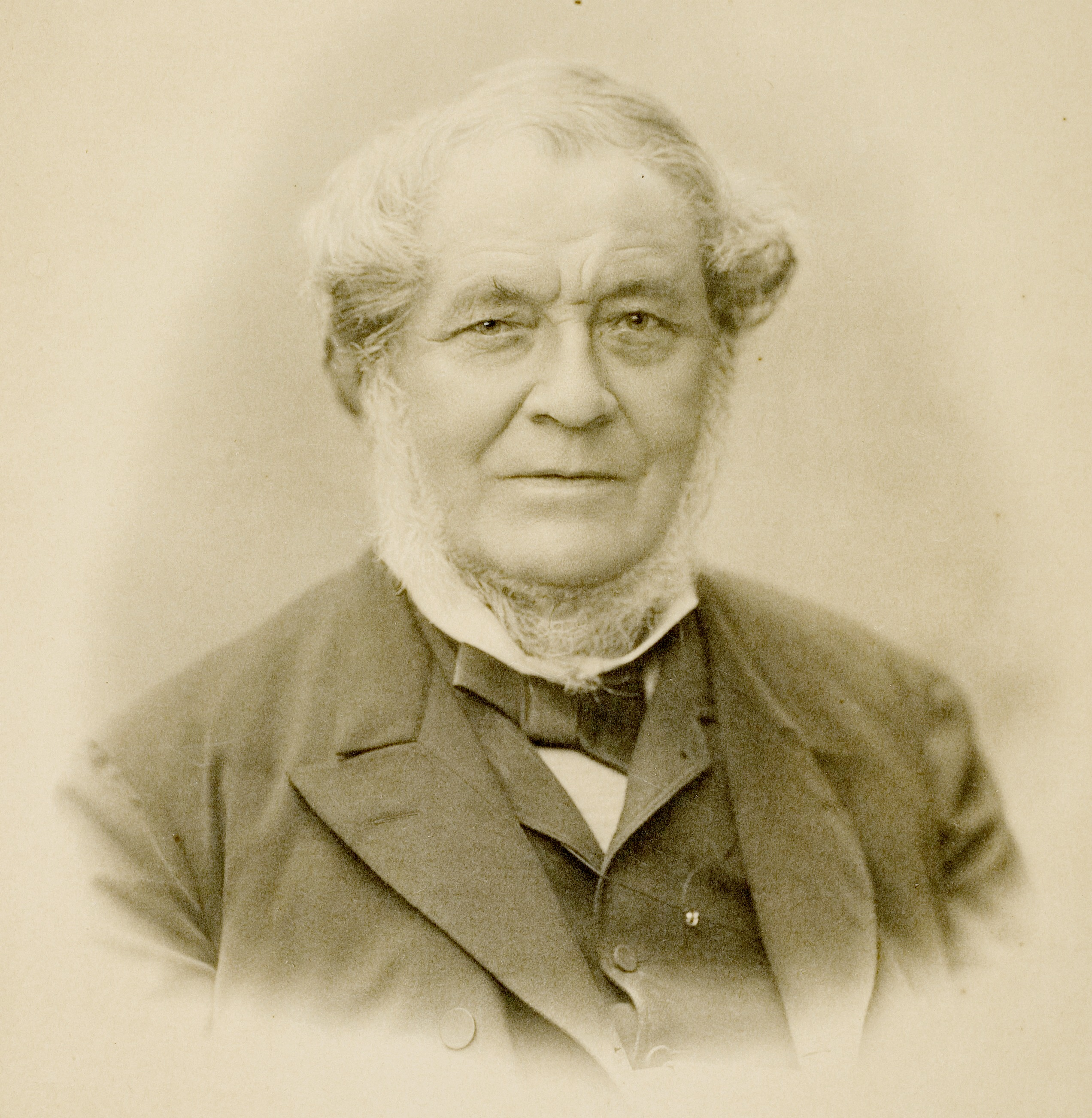
- Born: Robert Wilhelm Eberhard Bunsen; 30 March 1811; Göttingen, Kingdom of Westphalia, Confederation of the Rhine
- Died: 16 August 1899 (aged 88); Heidelberg, Grand Duchy of Baden, German Empire
- Education: University of Göttingen (PhD, 1831)
- Known for: Inventing the Bunsen cell (1841); Researching hydrothermal synthesis (1848); Describing the Bunsen reaction (1853); Discovering caesium (1860); Discovering rubidium (1861); Conceiving reciprocity (1862)
- Awards: Copley Medal (1860); Davy Medal (1877); Albert Medal (1898)
- Scientific career
- Fields: Chemistry
- Workplaces: University of Göttingen (1833–1836); Polytechnic School of Kassel (1836–1839); University of Marburg (1839–1851); University of Breslau (1851–1852); University of Heidelberg (1852–1889)
- Doctoral advisor: Friedrich Stromeyer
- Doctoral students: Adolf von Baeyer; Friedrich Konrad Beilstein; Georg Ludwig Carius; Edward Frankland; Hans Goldschmidt; Carl Graebe; Fritz Haber; Francis Robert Japp; Hermann Kolbe; Philipp Lenard; Adolf Lieben; Carl Friedrich Wilhelm Ludwig; Lothar Meyer; Viktor Meyer; Henry Enfield Roscoe; Thomas Edward Thorpe
- Other notable students: Julia Lermontova; Dmitri Mendeleev; Émile Meyerson; John Tyndall

Robert Wilhelm Eberhard Bunsen (German: [ˈʁoːbɛʁt ˈbʊnzn̩]; 30 March 1811 (Note: Sources disagree on Robert Bunsen's exact birth date. His parish register, as well as two curricula vitae handwritten by Bunsen himself, document 30 March 1811 as Bunsen's true birth date; however, many later sources cite 31 March as the date. According to his biographer Georg Lockemann, Bunsen himself celebrated his birthday on the 31st in his later years. Lockemann nevertheless regarded the 30th as the correct date.) – 16 August 1899) was a German chemist. He investigated emission spectra of heated elements, and discovered caesium in 1860 and rubidium in 1861 with the physicist Gustav Kirchhoff. The Bunsen–Kirchhoff Award for spectroscopy is named after Bunsen and Kirchhoff.

Bunsen also developed several gas-analytical methods, was a pioneer in photochemistry, and did early work in the field of organic arsenic chemistry. With his laboratory assistant Peter Desaga, he developed the Bunsen burner, an improvement on the laboratory burners then in use.

== Early life and education ==
Bunsen was born in Göttingen, Germany, on March 30, 1811, in what is now the state of Lower Saxony in Germany. Bunsen was the youngest of four sons of the University of Göttingen's chief librarian and professor of modern philology, Christian Bunsen (1770–1837).

After attending school in Holzminden, Bunsen matriculated at Göttingen in 1828 and studied chemistry with Friedrich Stromeyer, mineralogy with Johann Friedrich Ludwig Hausmann, and mathematics with Carl Friedrich Gauss. After obtaining a PhD in 1831, Bunsen spent 1832 and 1833 traveling in France, Germany, and Austria. During his journeys, Bunsen met the scientists Friedlieb Runge (who discovered aniline and in 1819 isolated caffeine), Justus von Liebig in Giessen, and Eilhard Mitscherlich in Bonn.

== Academic career ==
In 1833, Bunsen became a lecturer at Göttingen and began experimental studies of the (in)solubility of metal salts of arsenous acid. His discovery of the use of iron oxide hydrate as a precipitating agent led to what is still today the most effective antidote against arsenic poisoning. This interdisciplinary research was carried on and published in conjunction with the physician Arnold Adolph Berthold. In 1836, Bunsen succeeded Friedrich Wöhler at the Polytechnic School of Kassel (German: Baugewerkschule Kassel). Bunsen taught there for three years, and then accepted an associate professorship at the University of Marburg, where he continued his studies on cacodyl derivatives. He was promoted to full professorship in 1841. While at University of Marburg, Bunsen participated in the 1846 expedition for the investigation of Iceland's volcanoes.

Bunsen's work brought him quick and wide acclaim, partly because cacodyl, which is extremely toxic and undergoes spontaneous combustion in dry air, is so difficult to work with. Bunsen almost died from arsenic poisoning, and an explosion with cacodyl cost him sight in his right eye. His work with Cadet's fuming liquid was an important step in the development of the radical theory of organic compounds.

In 1841, Bunsen created the Bunsen cell battery, using a carbon electrode instead of the expensive platinum electrode used in William Robert Grove's electrochemical cell. Early in 1851 he accepted a professorship at the University of Breslau, where he taught for three semesters.

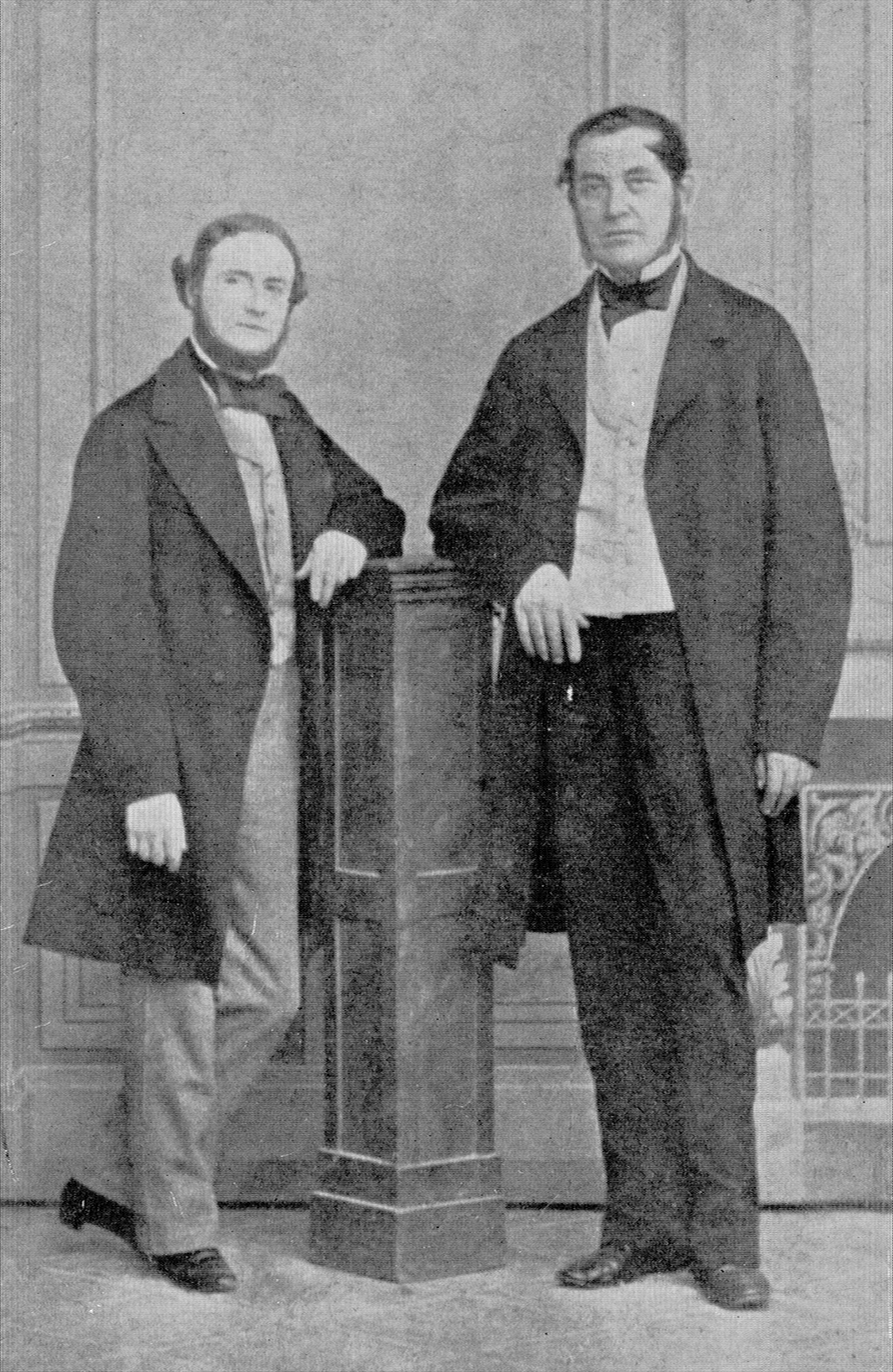
Gustav Kirchhoff (left) and Robert Bunsen (right)

In late 1852, Bunsen became the successor of Leopold Gmelin at the University of Heidelberg. There he used electrolysis to produce pure metals, such as chromium, magnesium, aluminium, manganese, sodium, barium, calcium, and lithium. A long collaboration with Henry Enfield Roscoe began in 1852, in which they studied the photochemical formation of hydrogen chloride (HCl) from hydrogen and chlorine. From this work, the reciprocity law of Bunsen and Roscoe originated. He discontinued his work with Roscoe in 1859 and joined Gustav Kirchhoff to study emission spectra of heated elements, a research area called spectrum analysis. For this work, Bunsen and his laboratory assistant, Peter Desaga, had perfected a special gas burner by 1855, which was influenced by earlier models. The newer design of Bunsen and Desaga, which provided a very hot and clean flame, is now called simply the "Bunsen burner", a common item of laboratory equipment.

There had been earlier studies of the characteristic colors of heated elements, but nothing systematic. In the summer of 1859, Kirchhoff suggested to Bunsen that he should try to form prismatic spectra of these colors. By October of that year, the two scientists had invented an appropriate instrument, a prototype spectroscope, an improvement of Joseph von Fraunhofer's 1814 spectroscope. Using it, they were able to identify the characteristic spectra of sodium, lithium, and potassium. After numerous laborious purifications, Bunsen proved that highly pure samples gave unique spectra. In the course of this work, Bunsen detected previously unknown new blue spectral emission lines in samples of mineral water from Dürkheim. He guessed that these lines indicated the existence of an undiscovered chemical element. After careful distillation of forty tons of this water, in the spring of 1860 he was able to isolate 17 grams of a new element. He named the element "caesium", after the Latin word for deep blue. The following year he discovered rubidium, by a similar process.

He was elected to Honorary membership of the Manchester Literary and Philosophical Society on 17 April 1860

In 1860, Bunsen was elected a foreign member of the Royal Swedish Academy of Sciences.

He was elected as a member of the American Philosophical Society in 1862.

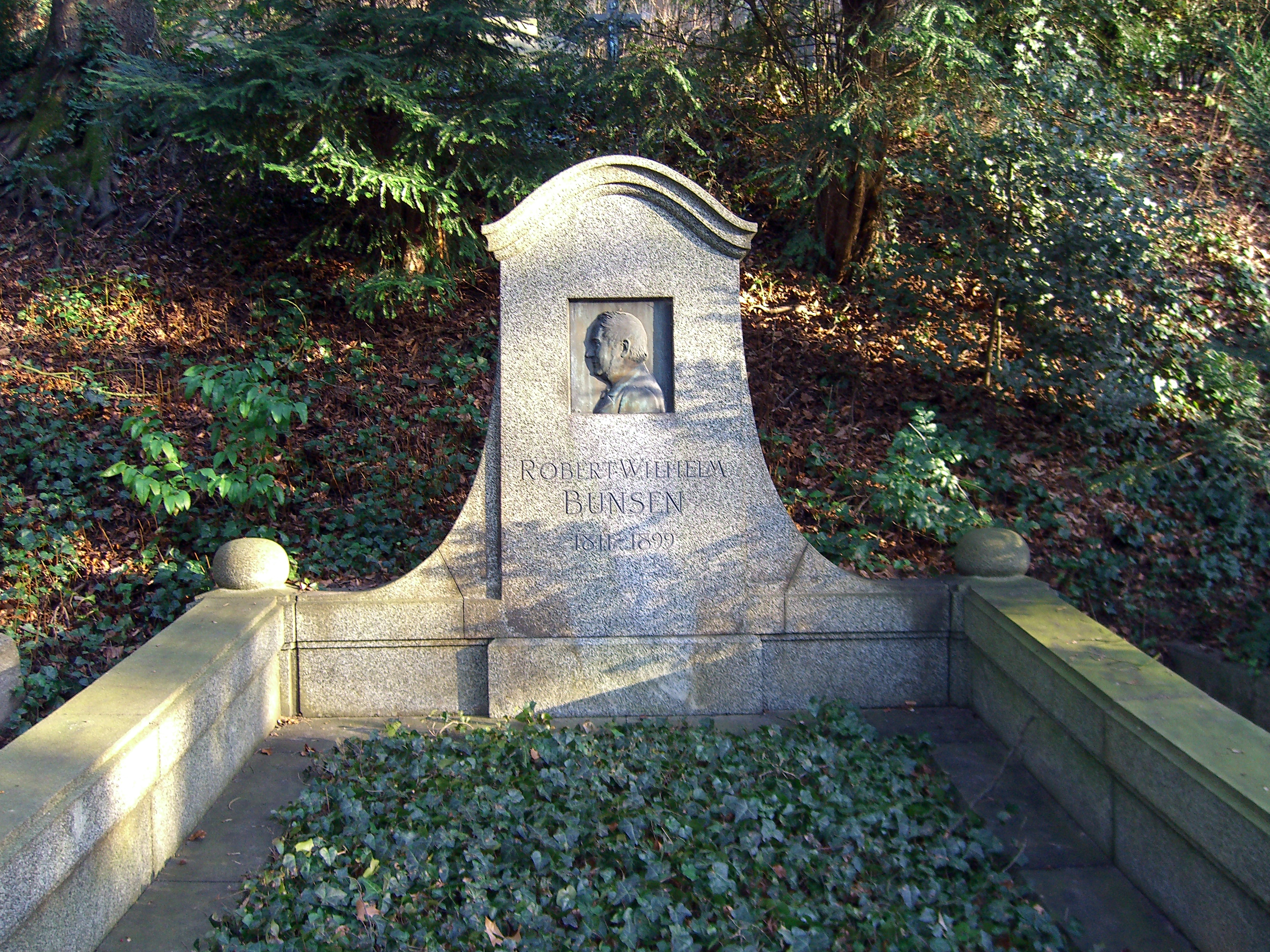
Bunsen's grave in Heidelberg's Bergfriedhof

In 1877, Robert Bunsen together with Gustav Robert Kirchhoff were the first recipients of the prestigious Davy Medal "for their researches and discoveries in spectrum analysis".

== Personality ==
Bunsen was a highly admired scientist of his generation. As a teacher, he was devoted to his students, and they were devoted to him. At a time of vigorous and often caustic scientific debates, Bunsen maintained his distance from theoretical disputes and preferred to work quietly in his laboratory. As a matter of principle, he never took out a patent. He never married.

Bunsen was a vivid "chemical character" with a well-developed sense of humour, and is the subject of many amusing anecdotes.

== Retirement and death ==
When Bunsen retired in 1889 at the age of 78, he shifted his work solely to geology and mineralogy, interests which he had pursued throughout his career. He died in Heidelberg, Germany on 16 August 1899, at the age of 88.

In 1964, the crater Bunsen on the Moon was named after him.

== See also ==
- Bunsenite
- Flash (photography)
- Geysir
- Lepidolite
- List of German inventors and discoverers
- Photobiology
- Volcanic gas
- Flame test
