= Peter Desaga =

German instrument maker

Peter Desaga was a German instrument maker at the University of Heidelberg who worked with Robert Bunsen. Collaborating with Bunsen in 1855 on interior facilities for the new chemical laboratory at the university, Desaga perfected an earlier design of the laboratory burner by Michael Faraday into the Bunsen burner.

Neither Desaga nor Bunsen patented the design, and many imitations were marketed.

The Bunsen burner was essential to the invention of the spectroscope by Robert Bunsen and Gustav Kirchhoff.

Peter Desaga's son, Carl Desaga, founded C. Desaga.
