= Alcohol burner =

Laboratory equipment for producing an open flame

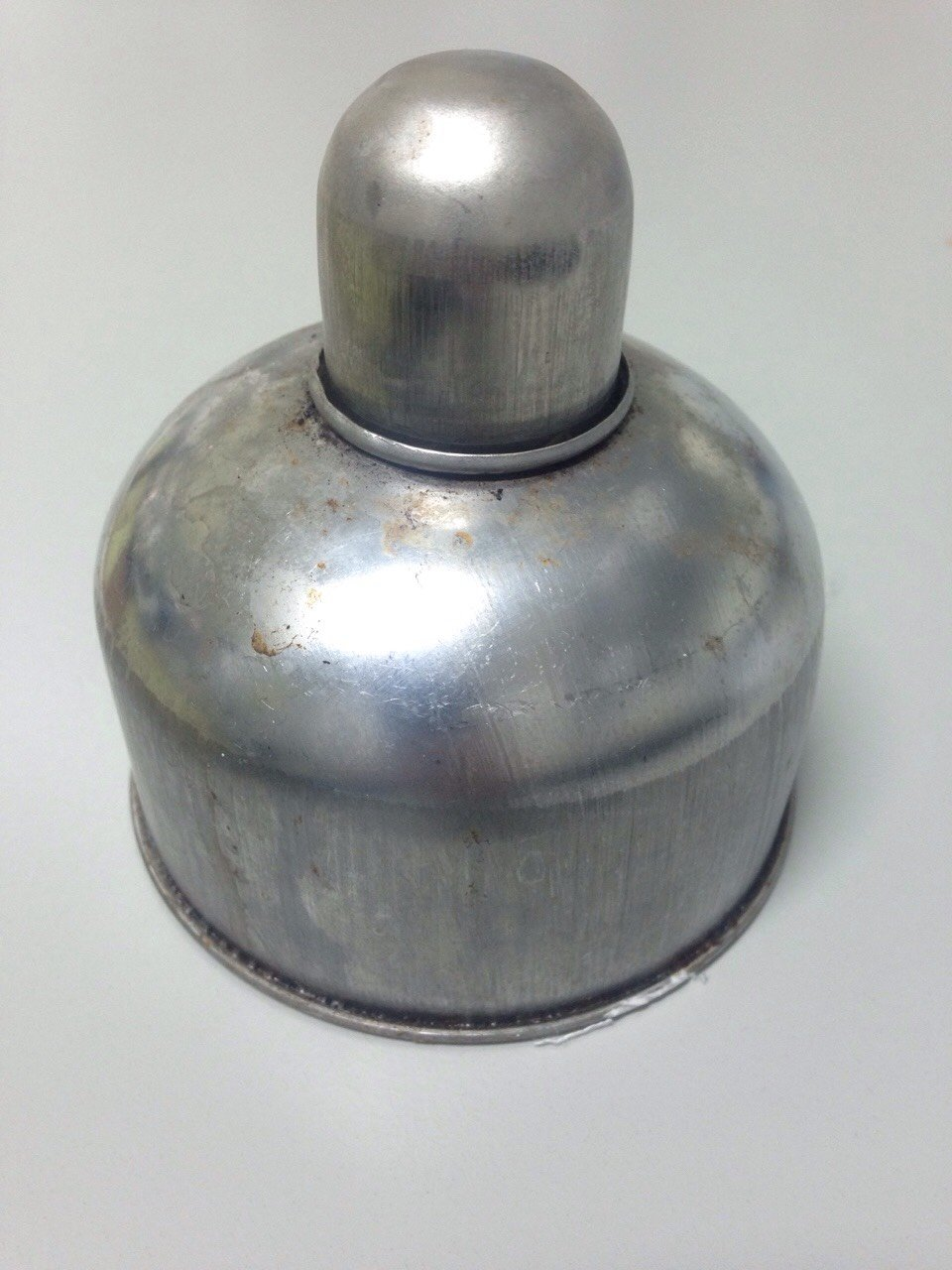
An aluminium alcohol burner

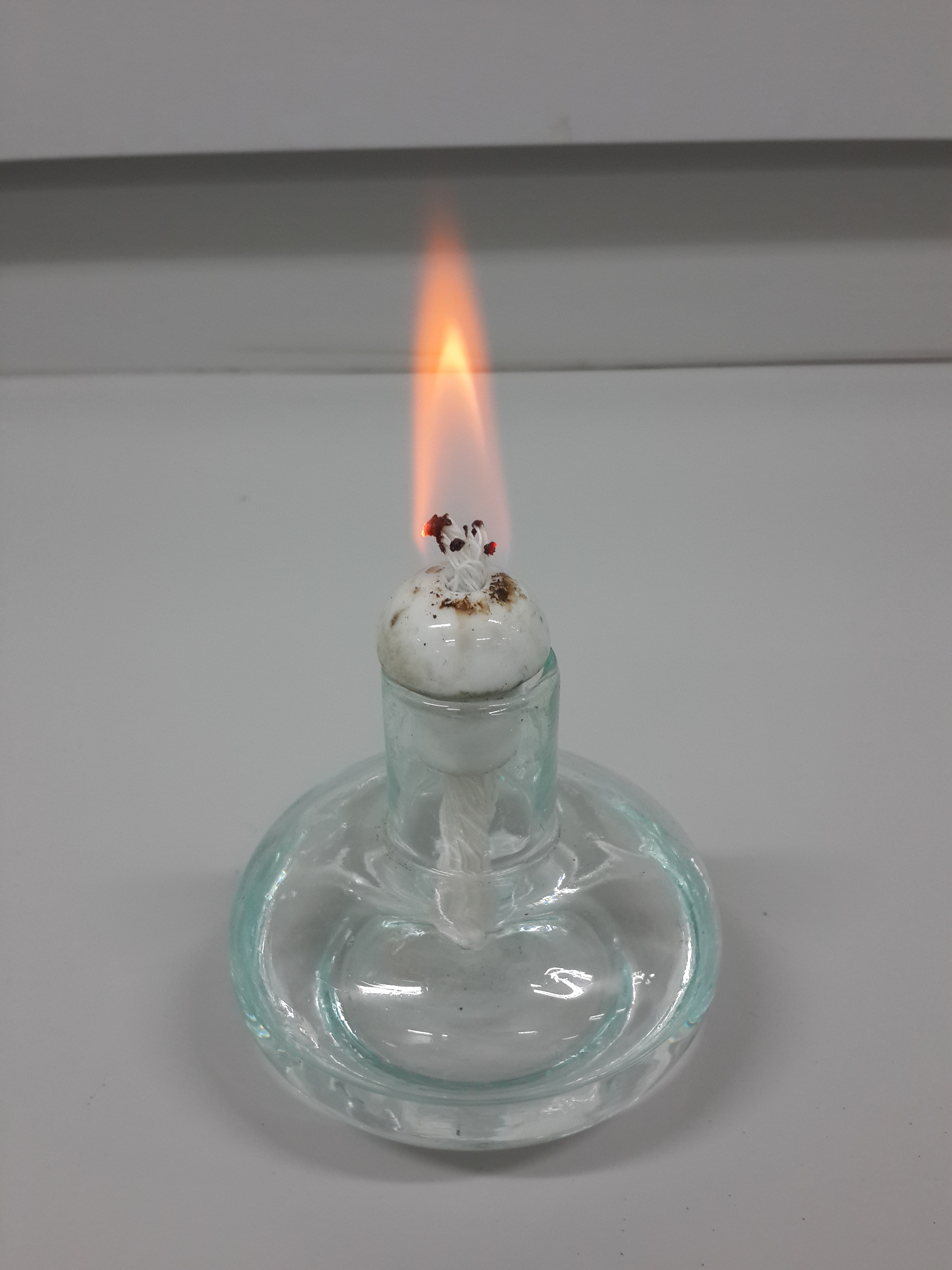
A glass alcohol burner

An alcohol burner or spirit lamp is a piece of laboratory equipment used to produce an open flame. It can be made from brass, glass, stainless steel or aluminium.

== Uses ==
Alcohol burners are preferred for some uses over Bunsen burners for safety purposes, and in laboratories where natural gas is not available. Their flame is limited to approximately 5 centimeters (two inches) in height, with a comparatively lower temperature than the gas flame of the Bunsen burner.

While they do not produce flames as hot as other types of burners, they are sufficiently hot for performing some chemistries, standard microbiology laboratory procedures, and can be used for flame sterilization of other laboratory equipment.

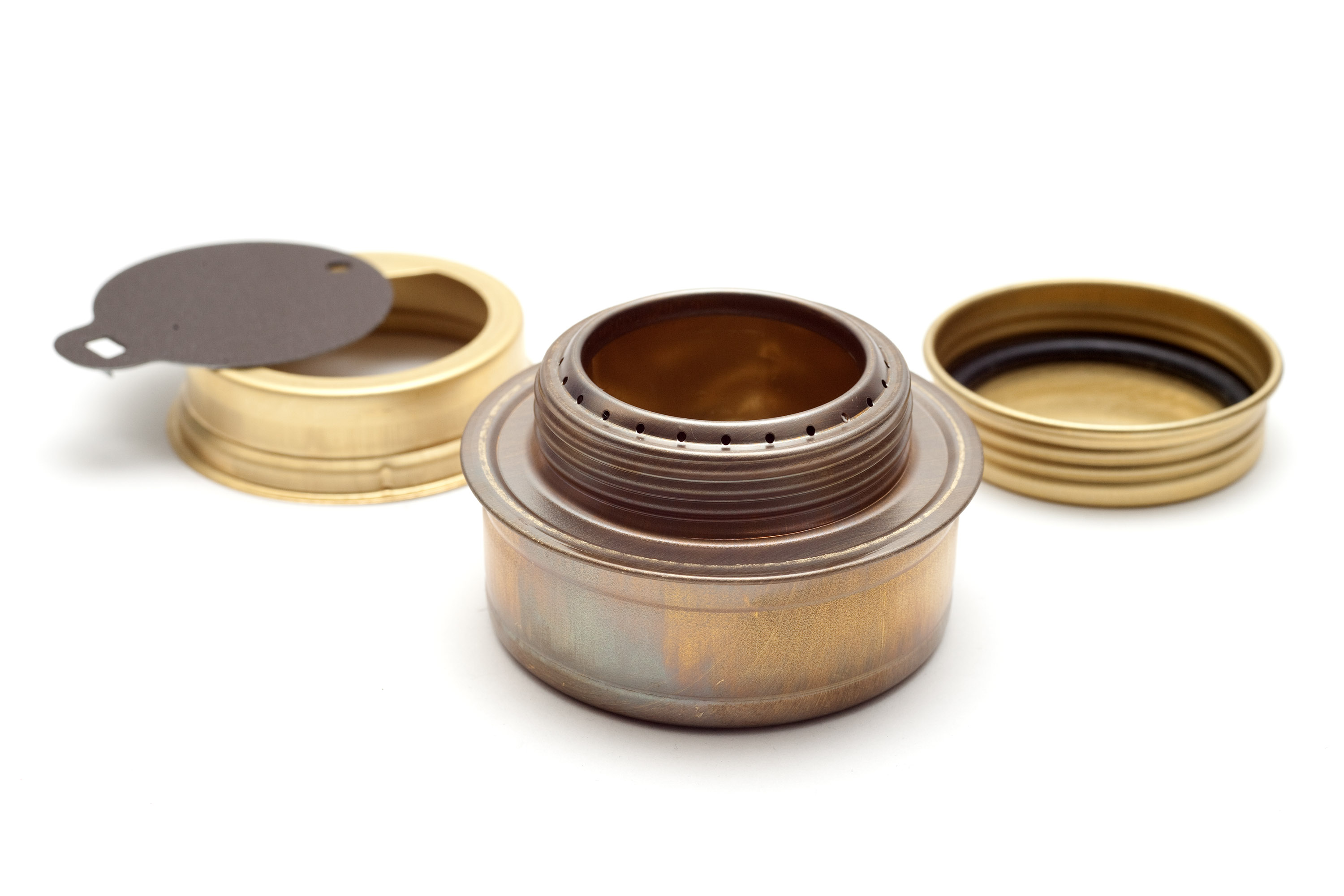
typical parts for camping alcohol burner

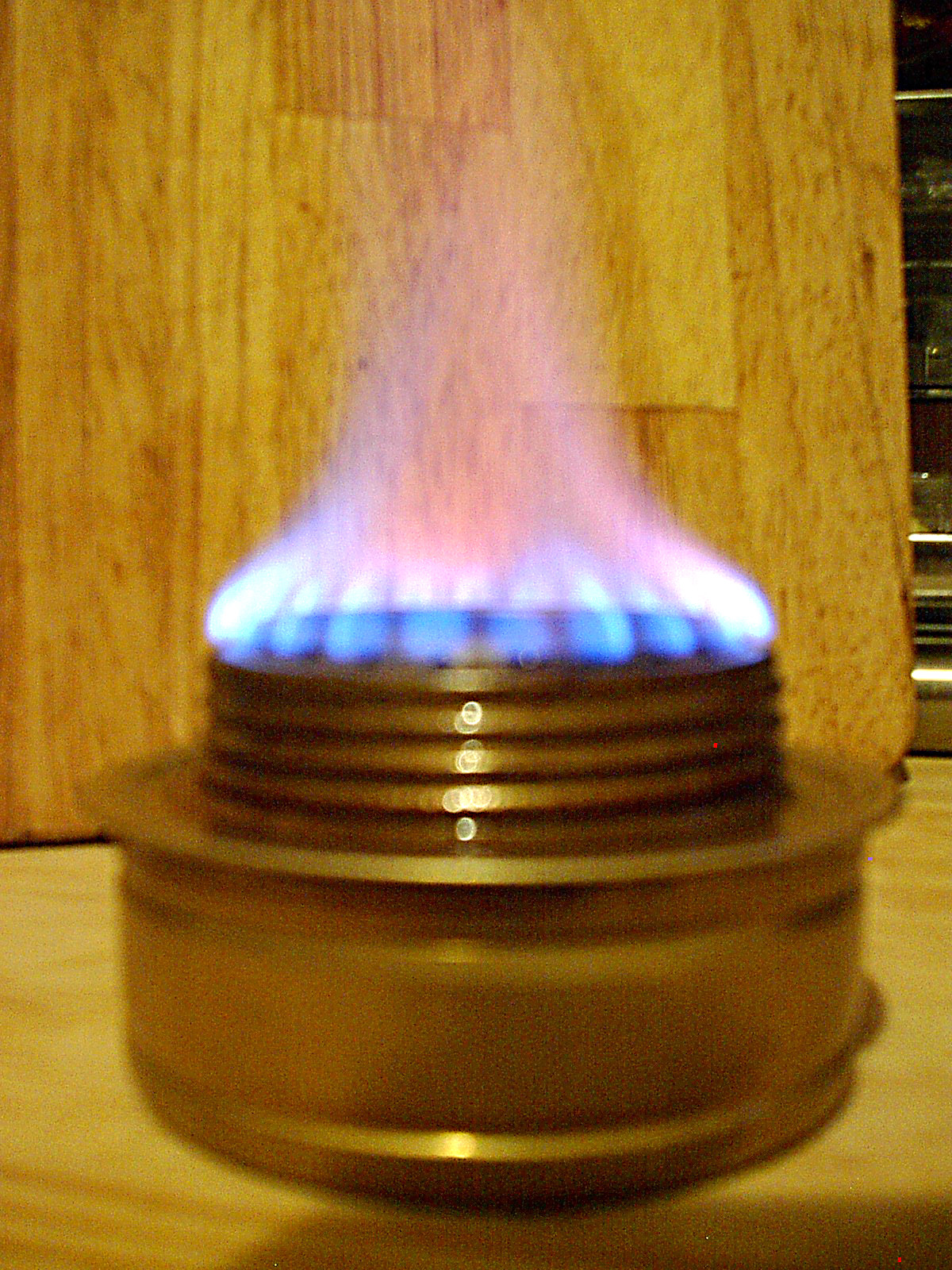
camping alcohol burner in action

A small alcohol burner is also preferred for camping when the need for fire is modest. It burns the alcohol vapor that rises due to the heat from the flame through the holes on the top perimeter of the container.

== Operation ==
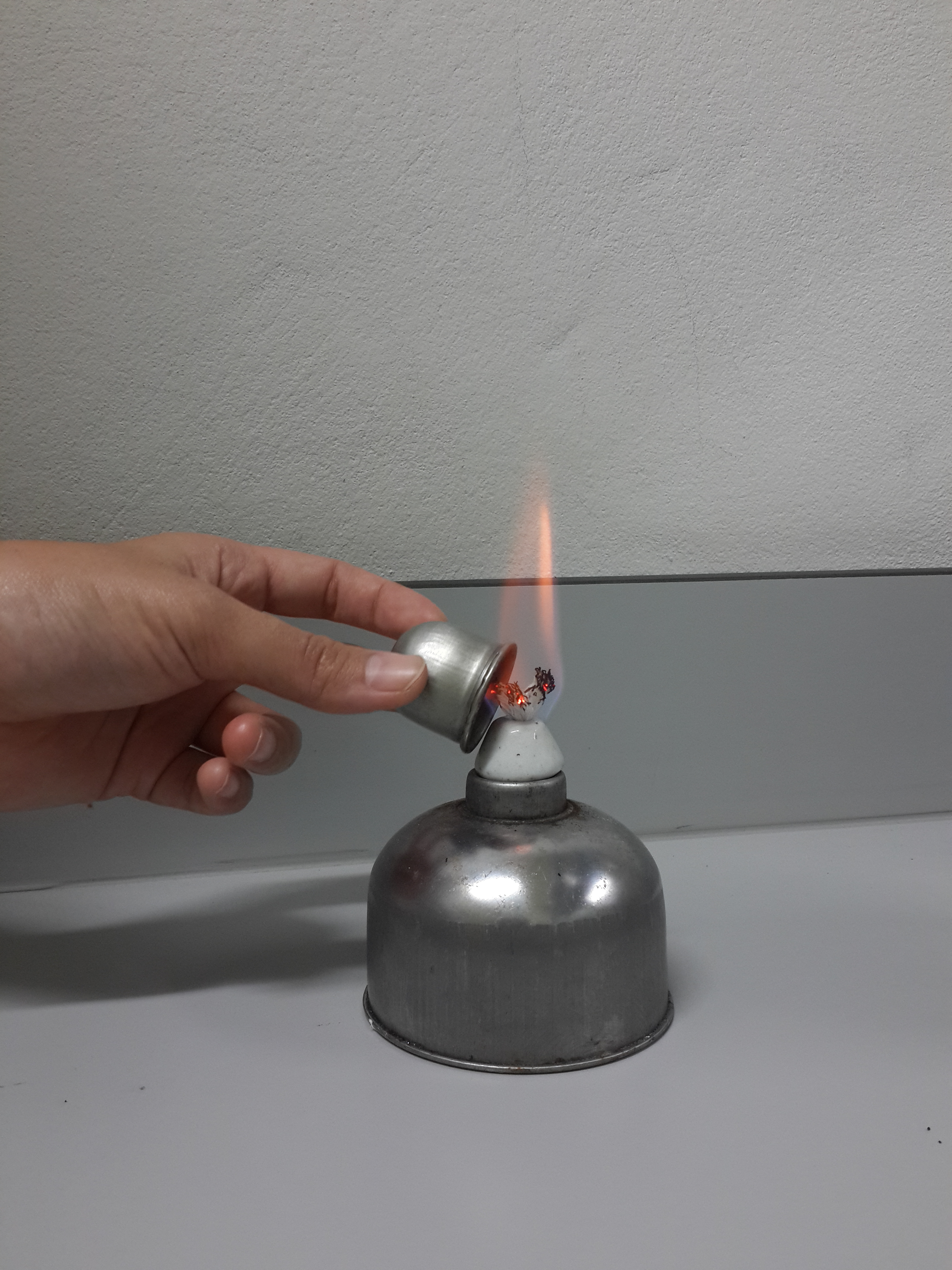
The burner's flame is capped like a candle to extinguish it.

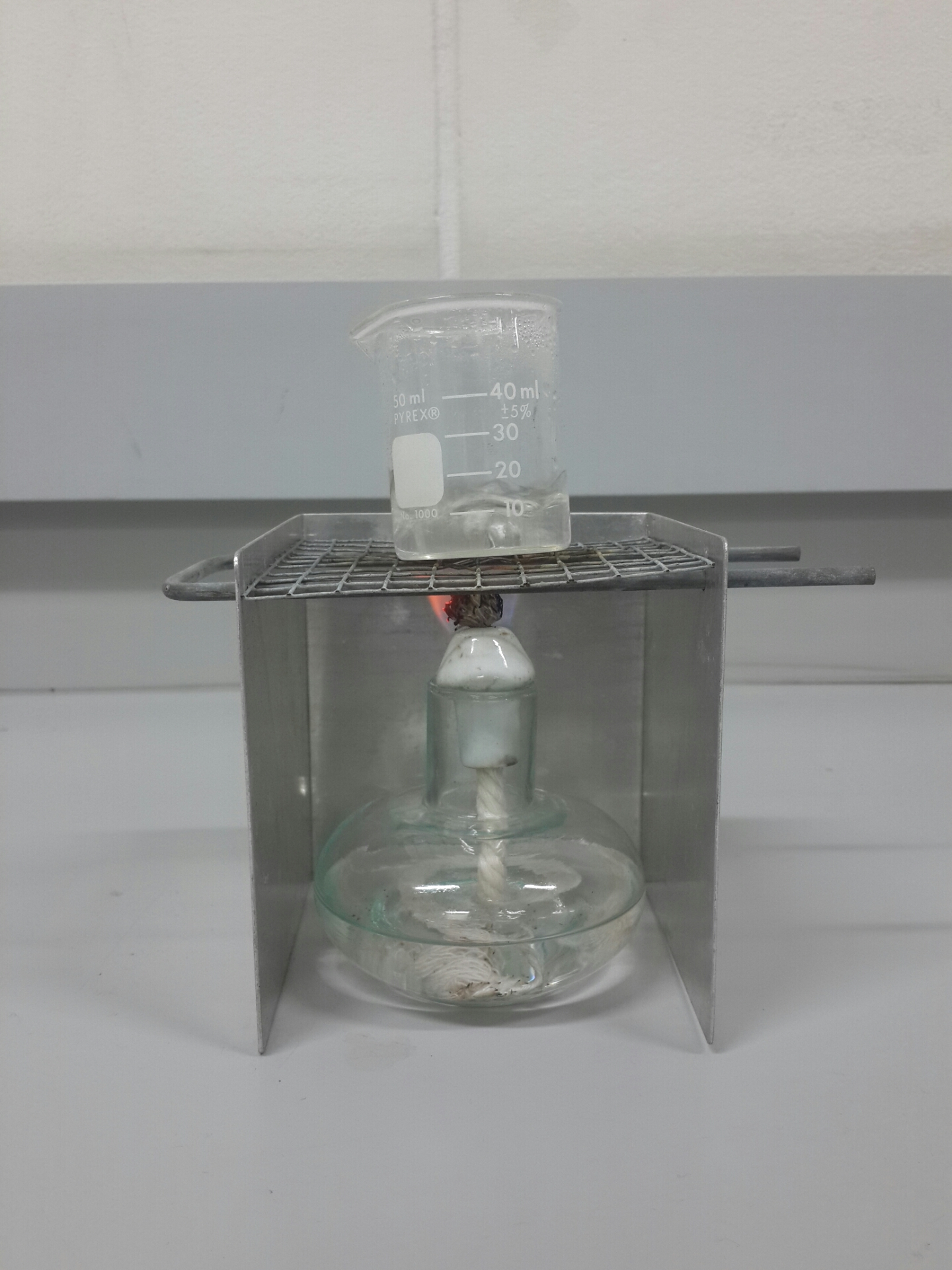
A small amount of liquid is boiling above the alcohol burner.

Typical fuel is denatured alcohol, methanol, or isopropanol. A cap is used as a snuffer for extinguishing the flame.

== See also ==
- Beverage-can stove
- Bunsen burner
- Fondue
- Heating mantle
- Portable stove
