= Wire gauze =

Fine metal net or mesh

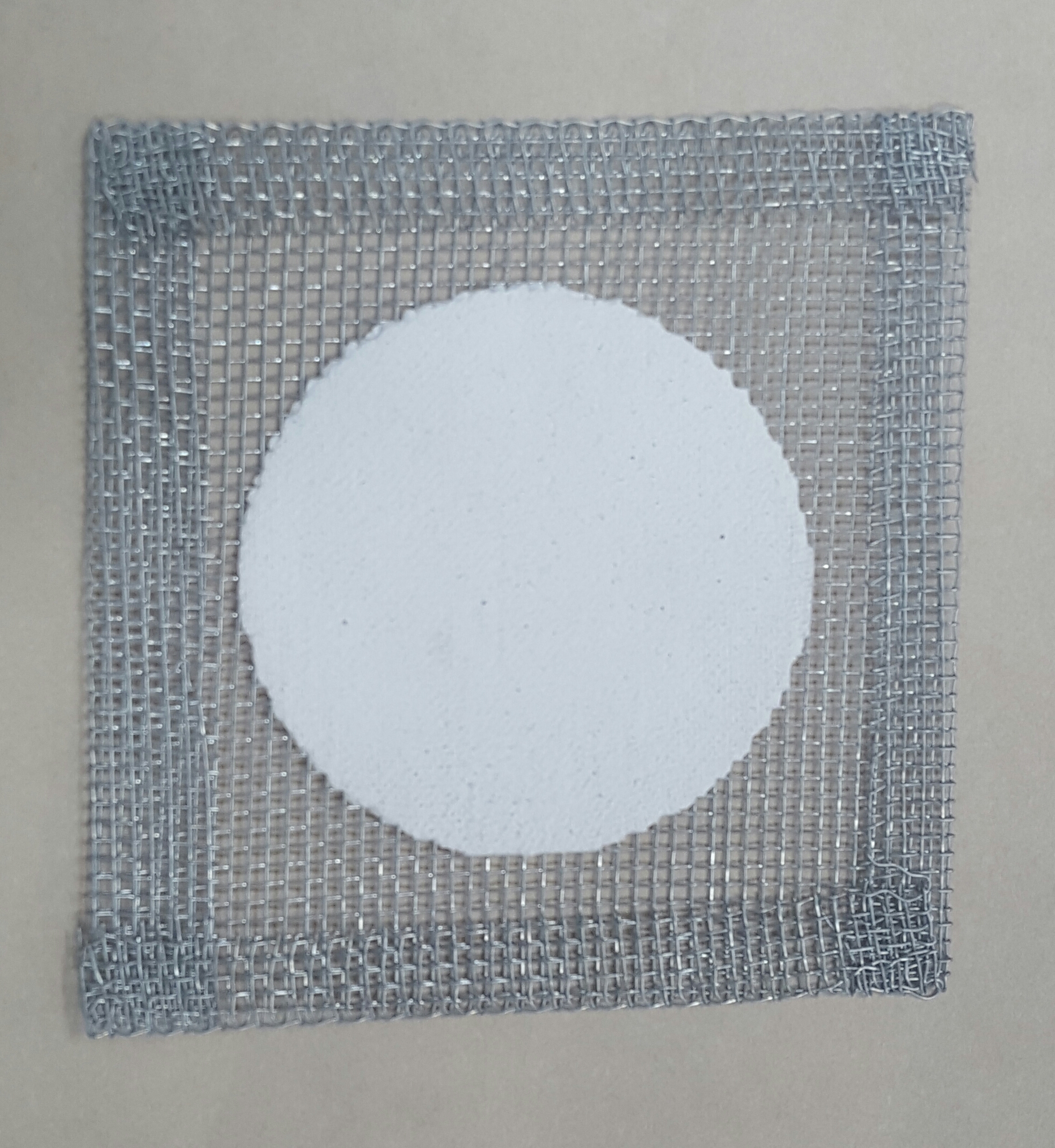
A 5-inch (125 mm) square of wire gauze with ceramic center

Using wire gauze with an alcohol burner

Wire gauze or wire mesh is a gauze woven of metal wire, or very fine, gauze-like wire netting. Wire gauze is placed on the support ring that is attached to the retort stand between a burner and glassware, or is placed on a tripod to support beakers, flasks, or other glassware to protect it during heating. Glassware should not be heated directly by the flame of a Bunsen or other gas burner; wire gauze diffuses the heat and protects the glassware. Glassware has to be flat-bottomed if rested on the wire gauze.

Wire gauze was also used in safety lamps containing a flame in coal mines and environments where flammable gases may build up; the gauze prevents the flame from igniting gas outside the lamp, causing an explosion.

Some wire gauze is made with a ceramic centre. Plain wire gauze can transmit heat efficiently, but gauze with a ceramic center disperses the heat more evenly. The ceramic at the centre of the wire gauze is enmeshed at high pressure to prevent it from peeling.

Traditionally the ceramic centre has contained asbestos. Although most suppliers in the EU now certify their ceramic-centred gauzes to be asbestos-free, imports from other countries may still contain it.

Wire gauze may be woven from metals including iron, steel, copper, and nichrome. Nichrome alloy provides long life expectancy and tear resistance. The edges of the wire gauze are turned inward to help prevent fraying, improve handling, and eliminate sharp protruding wire ends.

Ceramic-centered wire gauze is typically made in 4 inches (100 mm), 5 inches (130 mm), and 6 inches (150 mm) squares to accommodate different sizes of glassware.

== Additional images ==
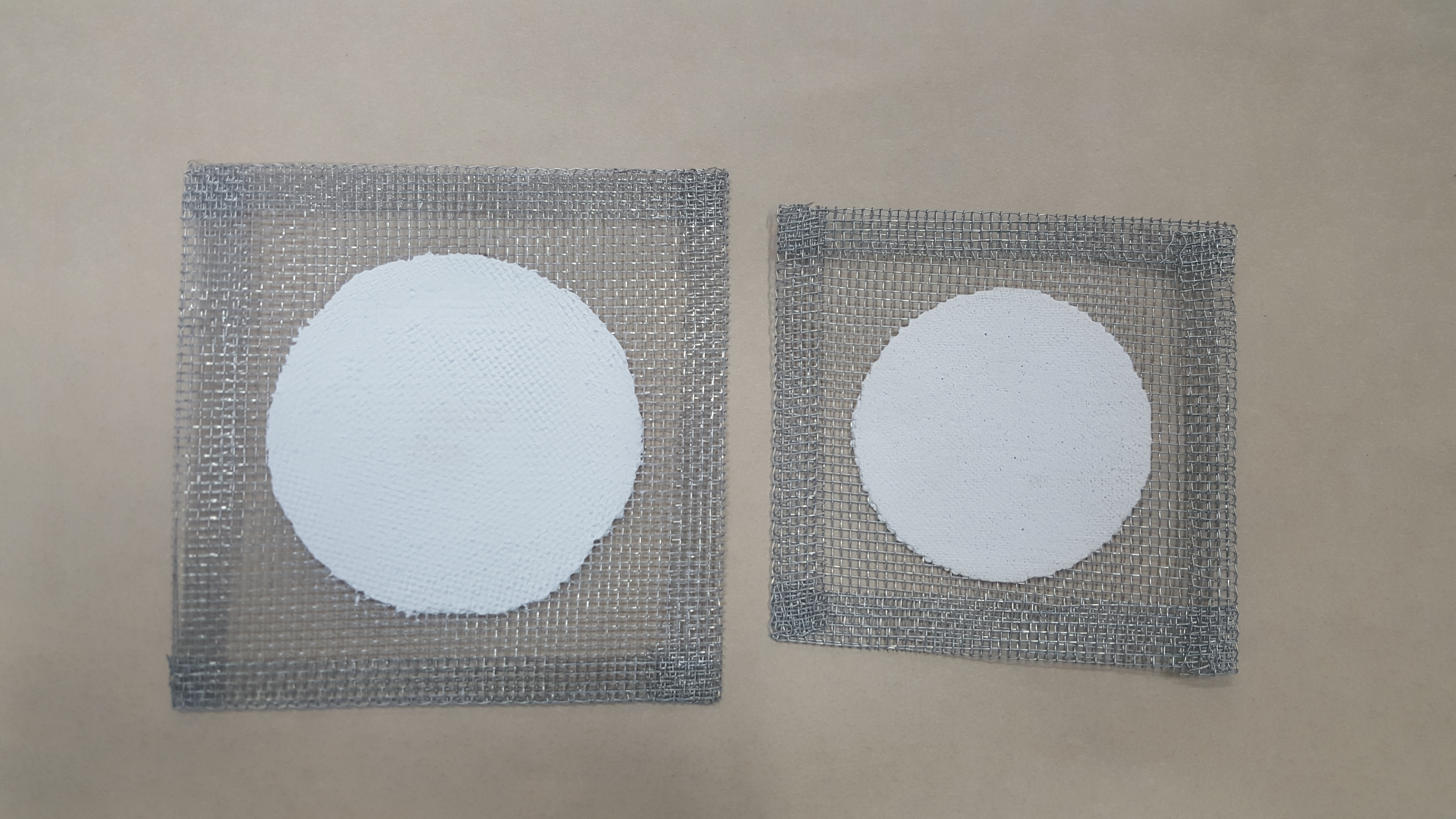
6-inch (150 mm) and 5-inch (125 mm) wire gauze squares

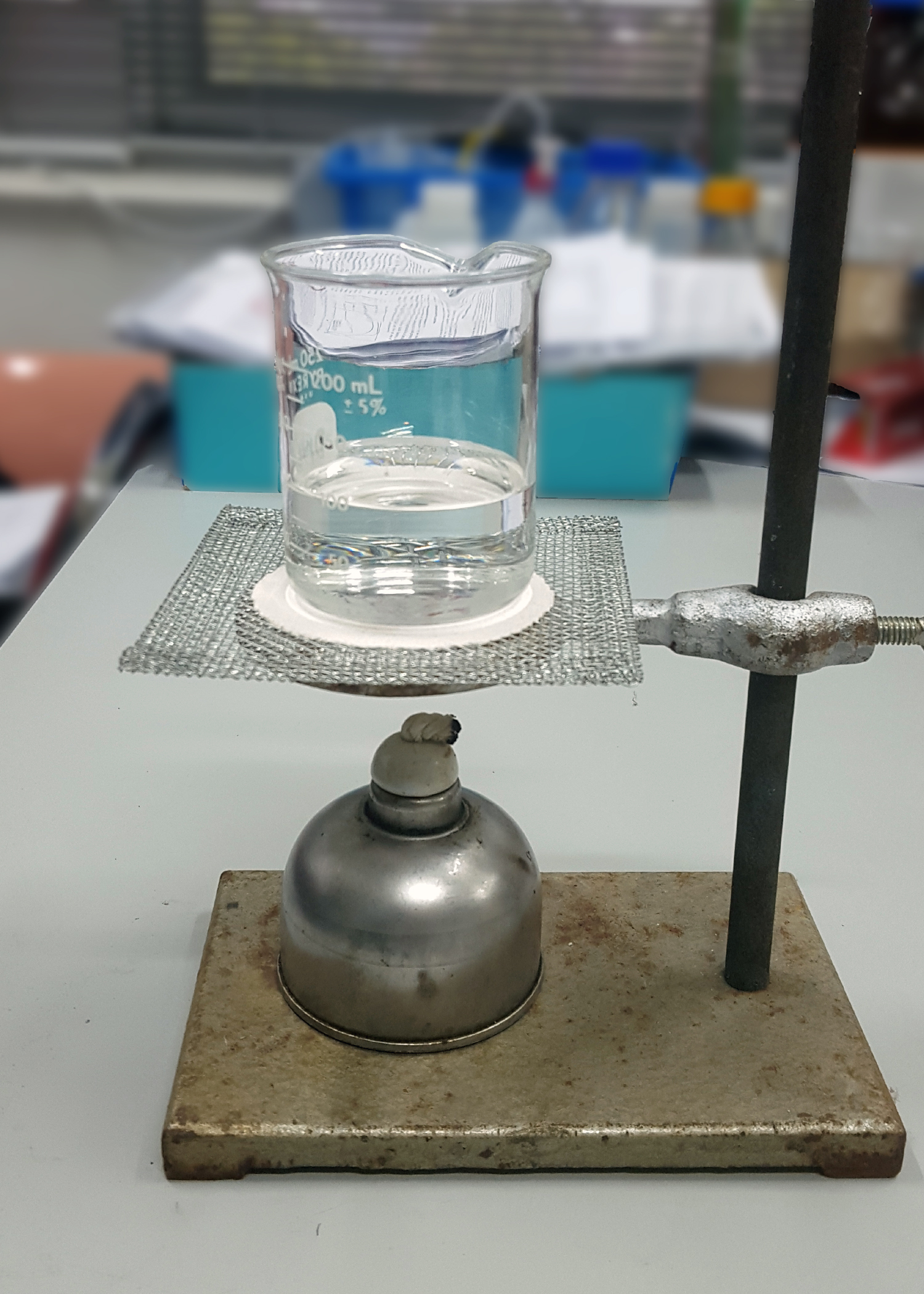
Beaker supported on wire gauze

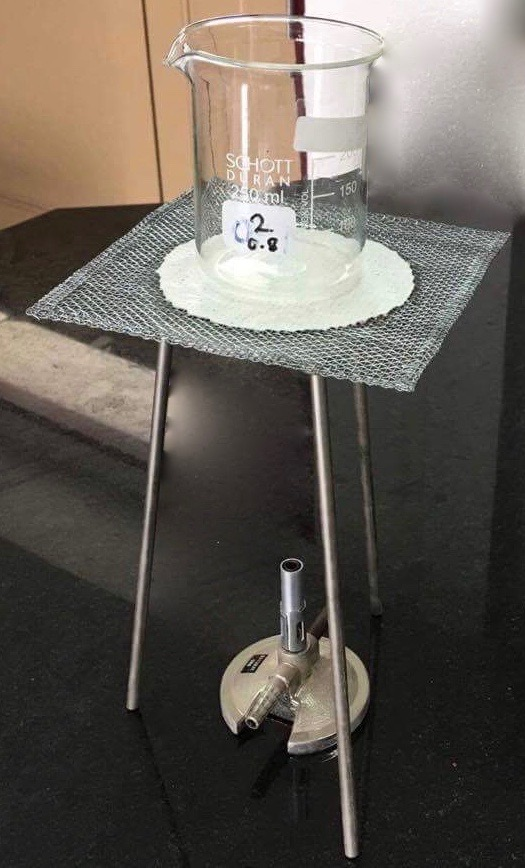
Beaker supported on wire gauze on tripod

== See also ==
- Heating mantle
- Tripod (laboratory)
