= Tripod (laboratory) =

Laboratory equipment

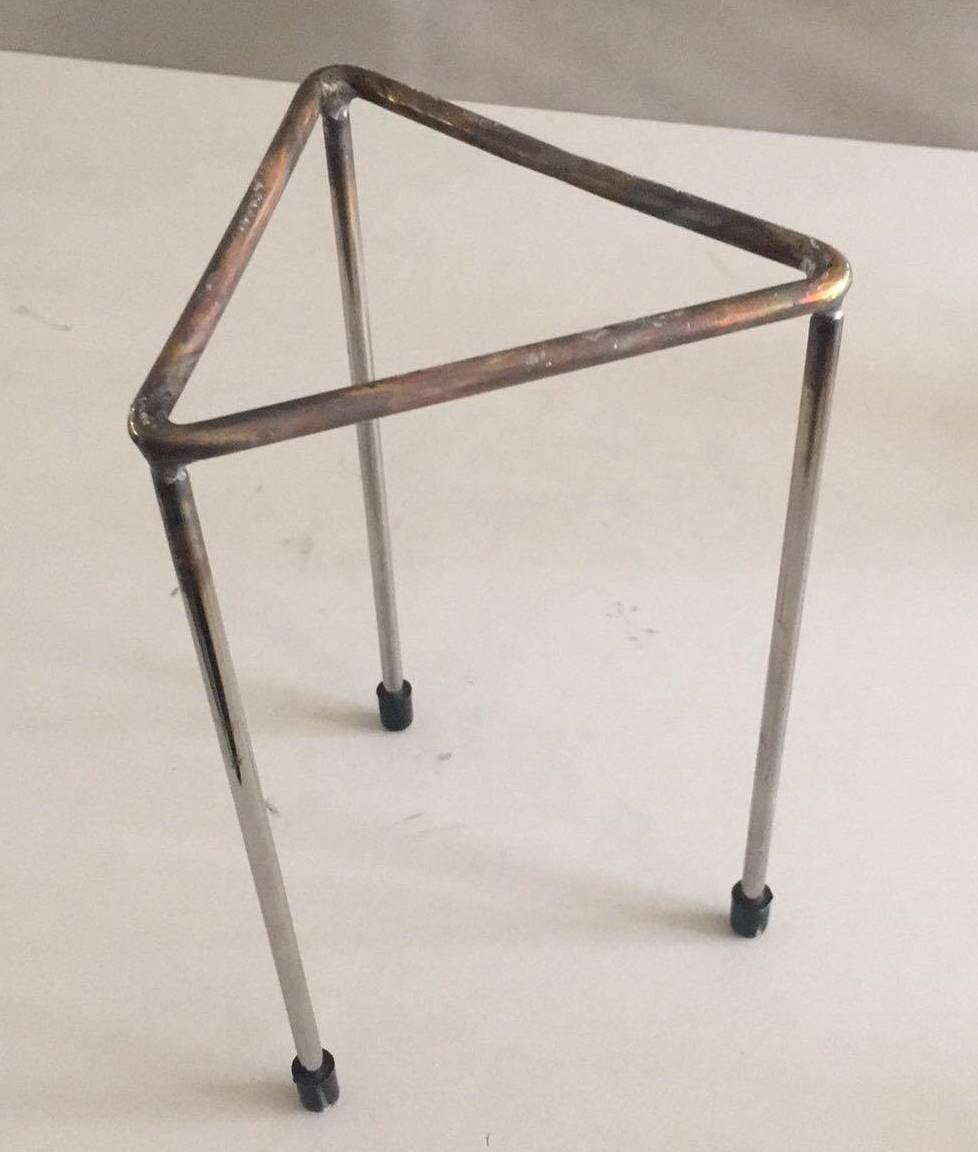
Laboratory Tripod

A laboratory tripod is a three-legged platform used to support flasks and beakers. Tripods are usually made of stainless steel or aluminium and made light-weight for efficient portability within the lab. Often a wire gauze is placed on top of the tripod to provide a flat base for glassware. Tripods are generally tall enough for a bunsen burner to be placed underneath.

== Variations ==
There are several different designs. The top is commonly triangular or circular, and sometimes the three legs can be removed and adjusted depending on the preferences of the user.

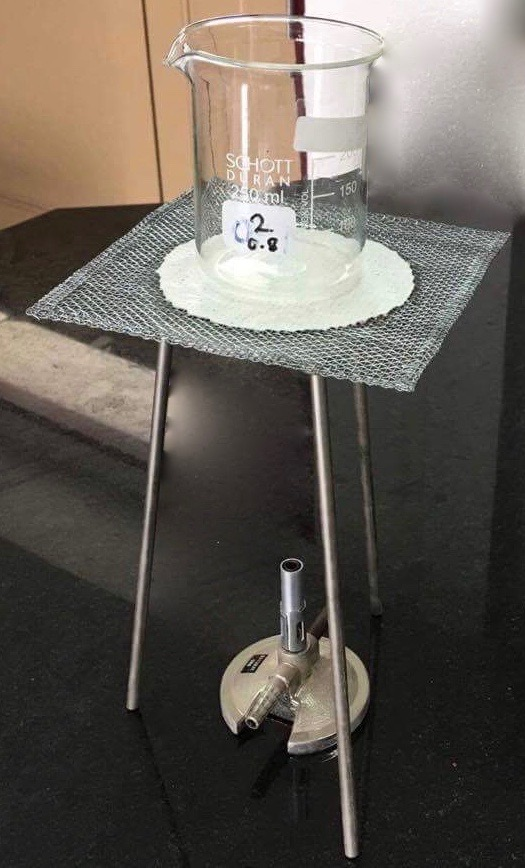
Laboratory tripod used in an experiment

== Usage ==
A laboratory tripod is most commonly used in middle and high schools for basic heating experiments. However, tripods and bunsen burners have been made obsolete by hot plates, which are considered to be safer since there is no direct contact with the flame.

== See also ==
- Bunsen burner
- Hot plate
- Tripod
- Wire gauze
