= Heating mantle =

Laboratory equipment for heating containers

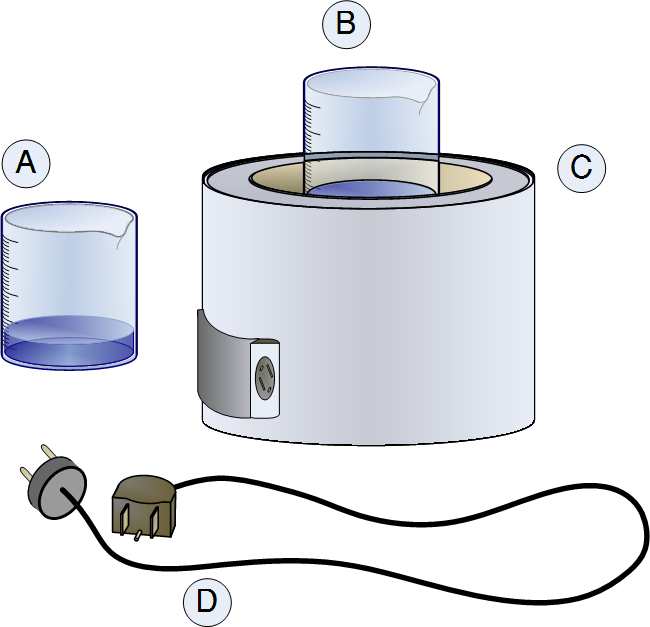
A canister-type heating mantle

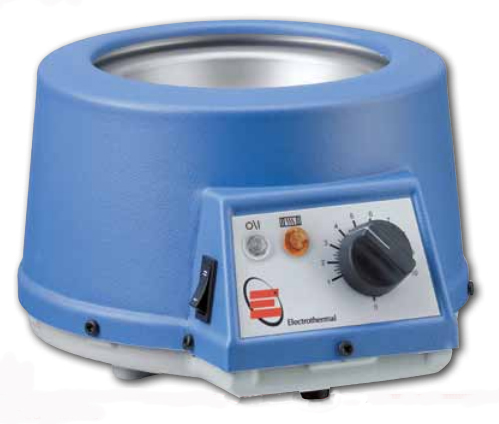
EMX heating mantle

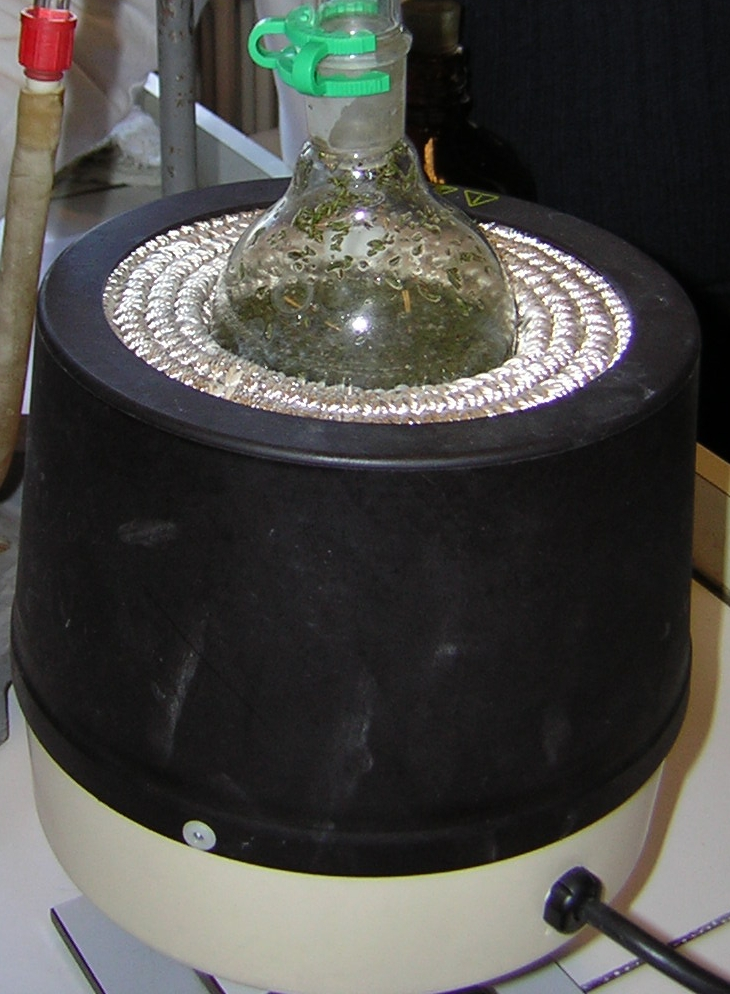
Lab heating mantle

A heating mantle, or isomantle, is a piece of laboratory equipment used to apply heat to containers, as an alternative to other forms of heated bath. In contrast to other heating devices, such as hotplates or Bunsen burners, glassware containers may be placed in direct contact with the heating mantle without substantially increasing the risk of the glassware shattering, because the heating element of a heating mantle is insulated from the container so as to prevent excessive temperature gradients. Heating mantles may have various forms. In a common arrangement, electric wires are embedded within a strip of fabric that can be wrapped around a flask. The current supplied to the device, and hence the temperature achieved, is regulated by a rheostat. This type of heating mantle is quite useful for maintaining an intended temperature within a separatory funnel, for example, after the contents of a reaction have been removed from a primary heat source.

Another variety of heating mantle may resemble a paint can and is constructed as a "basket" within a cylindrical canister (often made of plastic or metal such as aluminium). The rigid metal exterior supports a "basket" made of fabric and includes heating elements within the body of the heating mantle. To heat an object, it is placed within the basket of the heating mantle.

In further contrast to other methods of applying heat to a flask, such as an oil bath or water bath, using a heating mantle generates no liquid residue to drip off the flask. Also, heating mantles generally distribute heat evenly over the surface of the flask and exhibit less tendency to generate harmful hotspots.

== See also ==
- Double boiler
- Heating element
- Laboratory equipment
- Wire gauze
