= Bunsen burner =

Laboratory device used to make fire from fuel and oxidizer gases

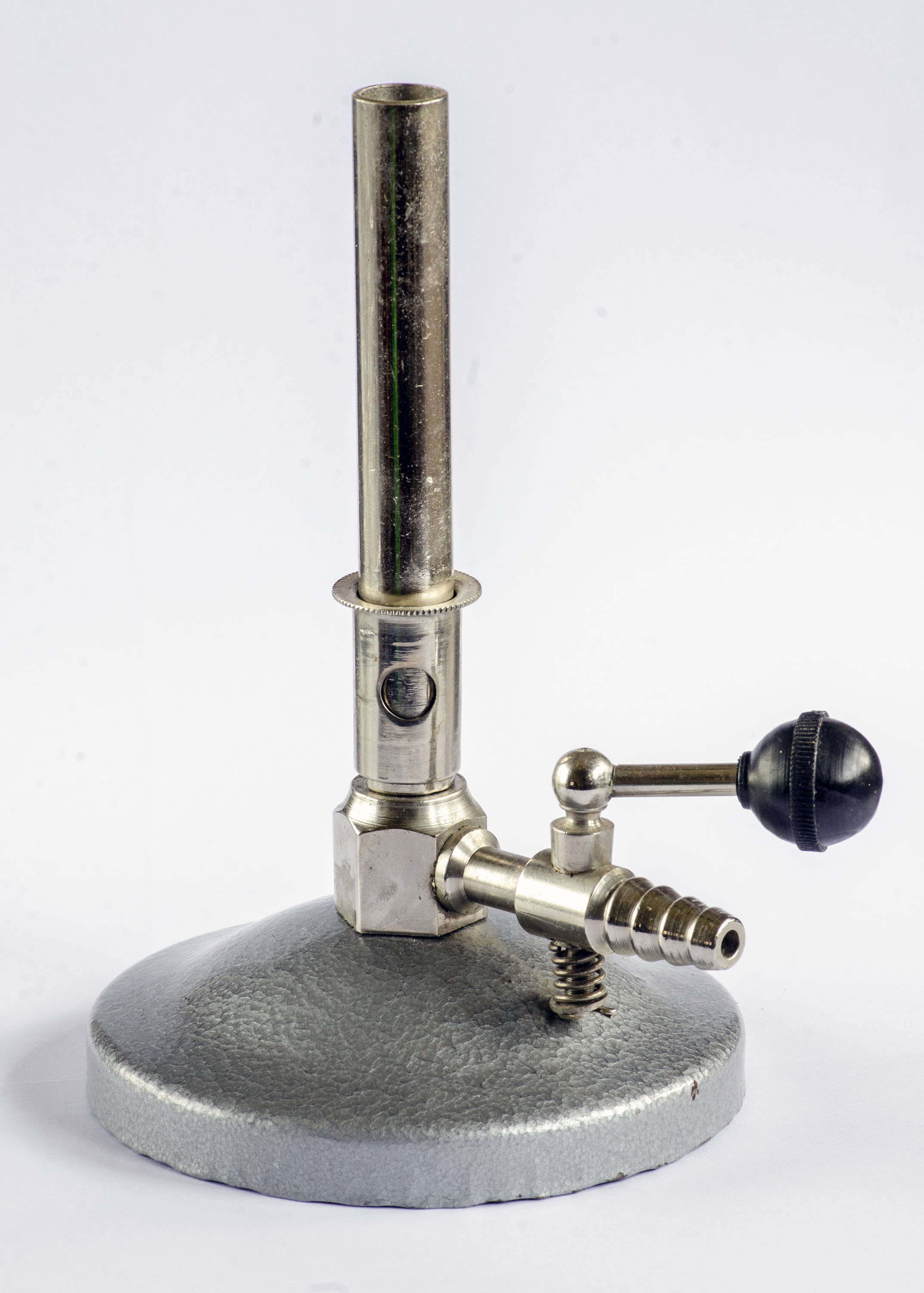
- A Bunsen burner. The hose barb for the gas tube is on the right and the valve for gas flow adjustment is next to it. The air inlet on this particular model is adjusted by rotating the sleeve on the barrel, thus opening or closing holes in the tube.
- Uses: Heating; Sterilization; Combustion
- Related items: Hot plate; Heating mantle; Meker-Fisher burner; Teclu burner

A Bunsen burner, named after Robert Bunsen, is a kind of ambient air gas burner used as laboratory equipment; it produces a single open gas flame, and is used for heating, sterilization, and combustion.

The gas can be natural gas, which is mainly methane, or a liquefied petroleum gas, such as propane, butane, a mixture or, as Bunsen himself used, coal gas. Combustion temperature achieved depends in part on the adiabatic flame temperature of the chosen fuel mixture.

== History ==
In 1852, the University of Heidelberg hired Bunsen and promised him a new laboratory building. The city of Heidelberg had begun to install coal-gas street lighting, and the university laid gas lines to the new laboratory.

The designers of the building intended to use the gas not just for lighting, but also as fuel for burners for laboratory operations. For any burner lamp, it was desirable to maximize the temperature of its flame, and minimize its luminosity (which represented lost heating energy). Bunsen sought to improve existing laboratory burner lamps with respect to economy, simplicity, and flame temperature, and adapt them to coal-gas fuel.

While the building was under construction in late 1854, Bunsen suggested certain design principles to the university's mechanic, Peter Desaga, and asked him to construct a prototype. Similar principles had been used in an earlier burner design by Michael Faraday, and in a device patented in 1856 by gas engineer R. W. Elsner. The Bunsen/Desaga design generated a hot, sootless, non-luminous flame by mixing the gas with air in a controlled fashion before combustion. Desaga created adjustable slits for air at the bottom of the cylindrical burner, with the flame issuing at the top. When the building opened early in 1855, Desaga had made 50 burners for Bunsen's students. Two years later Bunsen published a description, and many of his colleagues soon adopted the design. Bunsen burners are now used in laboratories around the world.

== Operation ==
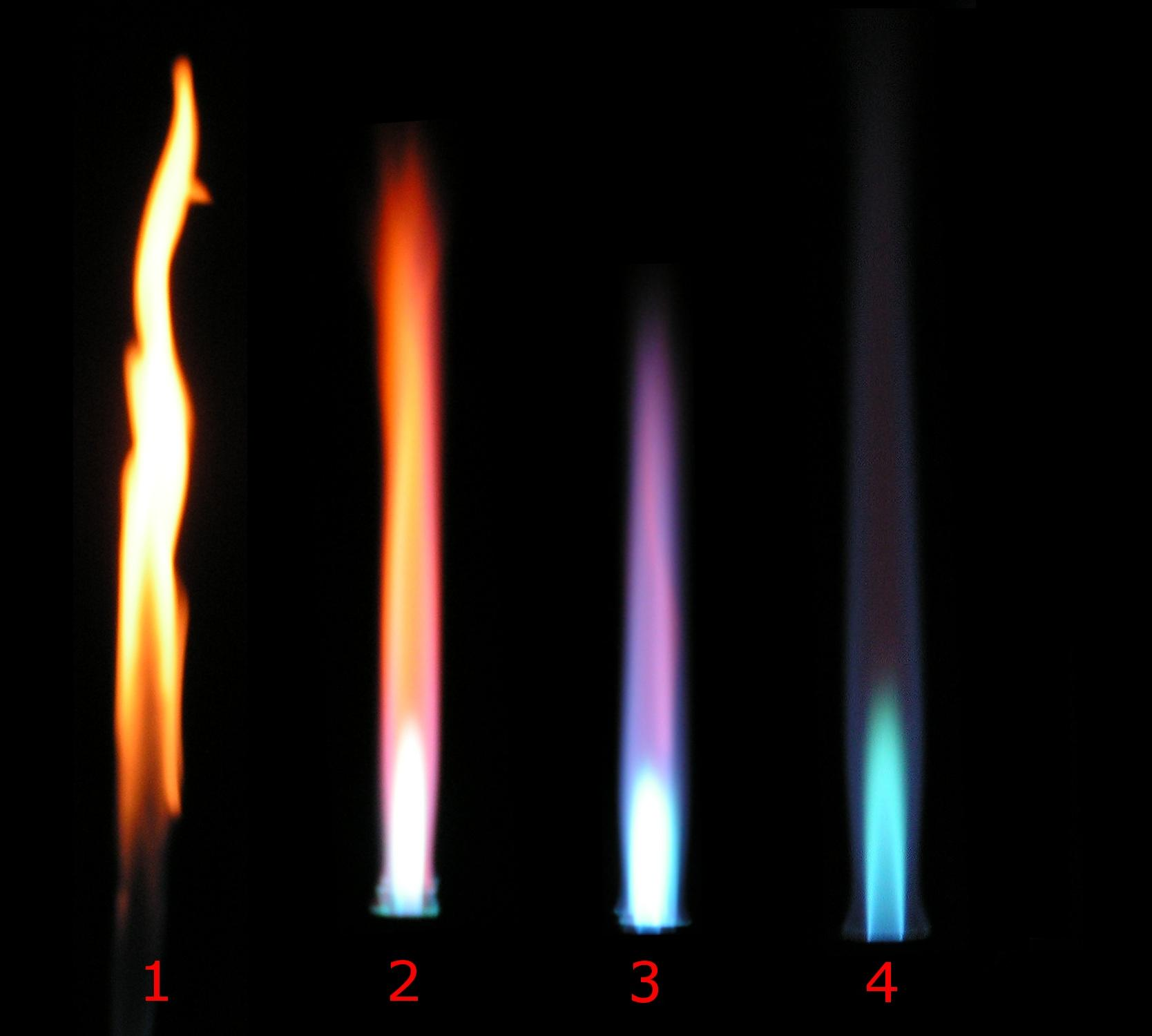
Bunsen burner flames depend on air flow in the throat holes (on the burner side, not the needle valve for gas flow): 1. air hole closed (safety flame used for lighting or default), 2. air hole slightly open, 3. air hole half-open, 4. air hole fully open (roaring blue flame).

The device in use today safely burns a continuous stream of a flammable gas such as natural gas (which is principally methane) or a liquefied petroleum gas such as propane, butane, or a mixture of both.

The hose barb is connected to a gas nozzle on the laboratory bench with rubber tubing. Most laboratory benches are equipped with multiple gas nozzles connected to a central gas source, as well as vacuum, nitrogen, and steam nozzles. The gas then flows up through the base through a small hole at the bottom of the barrel and is directed upward. There are open slots in the side of the tube bottom to admit air into the stream using the Venturi effect, and the gas burns at the top of the tube once ignited by a flame or spark. The most common methods of lighting the burner are using a match or a spark lighter.

The amount of air mixed with the gas stream affects the completeness of the combustion reaction. Less air yields an incomplete and thus cooler reaction, while a gas stream well mixed with air provides oxygen in a stoichiometric amount and thus a complete and hotter reaction. The air flow can be controlled by opening or closing the slot openings at the base of the barrel, similar in function to the choke in a carburettor.

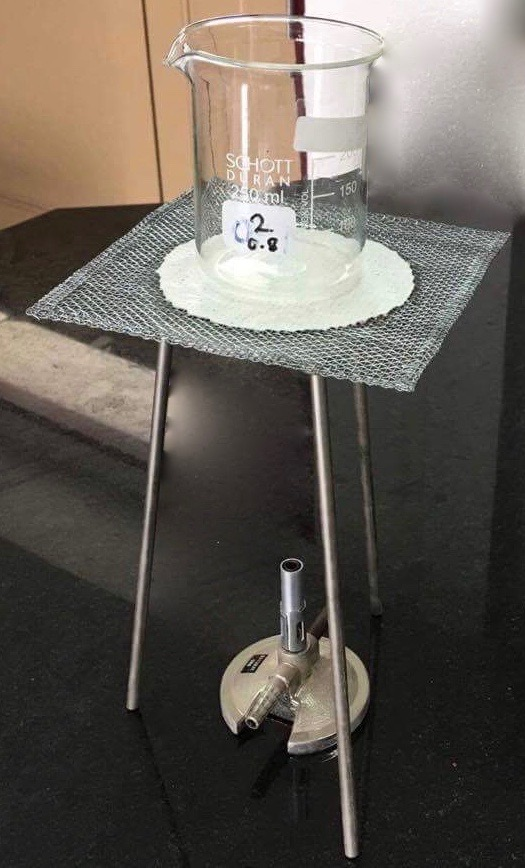
A Bunsen burner situated below a tripod

If the collar at the bottom of the tube is adjusted so more air can mix with the gas before combustion, the flame will burn hotter, appearing blue as a result. If the holes are closed, the gas will only mix with ambient air at the point of combustion, that is, only after it has exited the tube at the top. This reduced mixing produces an incomplete reaction, producing a cooler but brighter yellow, which is often called the "safety flame" or "luminous flame". The yellow flame is luminous due to small soot particles in the flame, which are heated to incandescence. The yellow flame is considered "dirty" because it leaves a layer of carbon on whatever it is heating. When the burner is regulated to produce a hot, blue flame, it can be nearly invisible against some backgrounds. The hottest part of the flame is the tip of the inner flame, while the coolest is the whole inner flame. Increasing the amount of fuel gas flow through the tube by opening the needle valve will increase the size of the flame. However, unless the airflow is adjusted as well, the flame temperature will decrease because an increased amount of gas is now mixed with the same amount of air, starving the flame of oxygen.

Generally, the burner is placed underneath a laboratory tripod, which supports a beaker or other container. The burner will often be placed on a suitable heatproof mat to protect the laboratory bench surface.

A Bunsen burner is also used in microbiology laboratories to sterilise pieces of equipment and to produce an updraft intended to force airborne contaminants away from the working area. Research conducted in 2026 indicated that contaminants are not directed as presumed, however, and may contribute to increasing exposure in the work area.

== Variants ==
Other burners based on the same principle exist. The most important alternatives to the Bunsen burner are:

- Teclu burner – The lower part of its tube is conical, with a round screw nut below its base. The gap, set by the distance between the nut and the end of the tube, regulates the influx of the air in a way similar to the open slots of the Bunsen burner. The Teclu burner provides better mixing of air and fuel and can achieve higher flame temperatures than the Bunsen burner.
- Meker burner – The lower part of its tube has more openings with larger total cross-section, admitting more air and facilitating better mixing of air and gas. The tube is wider and its top is covered with a wire grid. The grid separates the flame into an array of smaller flames with a common external envelope, and also prevents flashback to the bottom of the tube, which is a risk at high air-to-fuel ratios and limits the maximum rate of air intake in a conventional Bunsen burner. Flame temperatures of up to 1,100–1,200 °C (2,000–2,200 °F) are achievable if properly used. The flame also burns without noise, unlike the Bunsen or Teclu burners.
- Tirrill burner – The base of the burner has a needle valve which allows the regulation of gas intake directly from the burner, rather than from the gas source. Maximum temperature of flame can reach 1560 °C.

== See also ==
- Alcohol burner
- Heating mantle
- Meker-Fisher burner
- Teclu burner
