= Chaghajikchay =

River in Azerbaijan

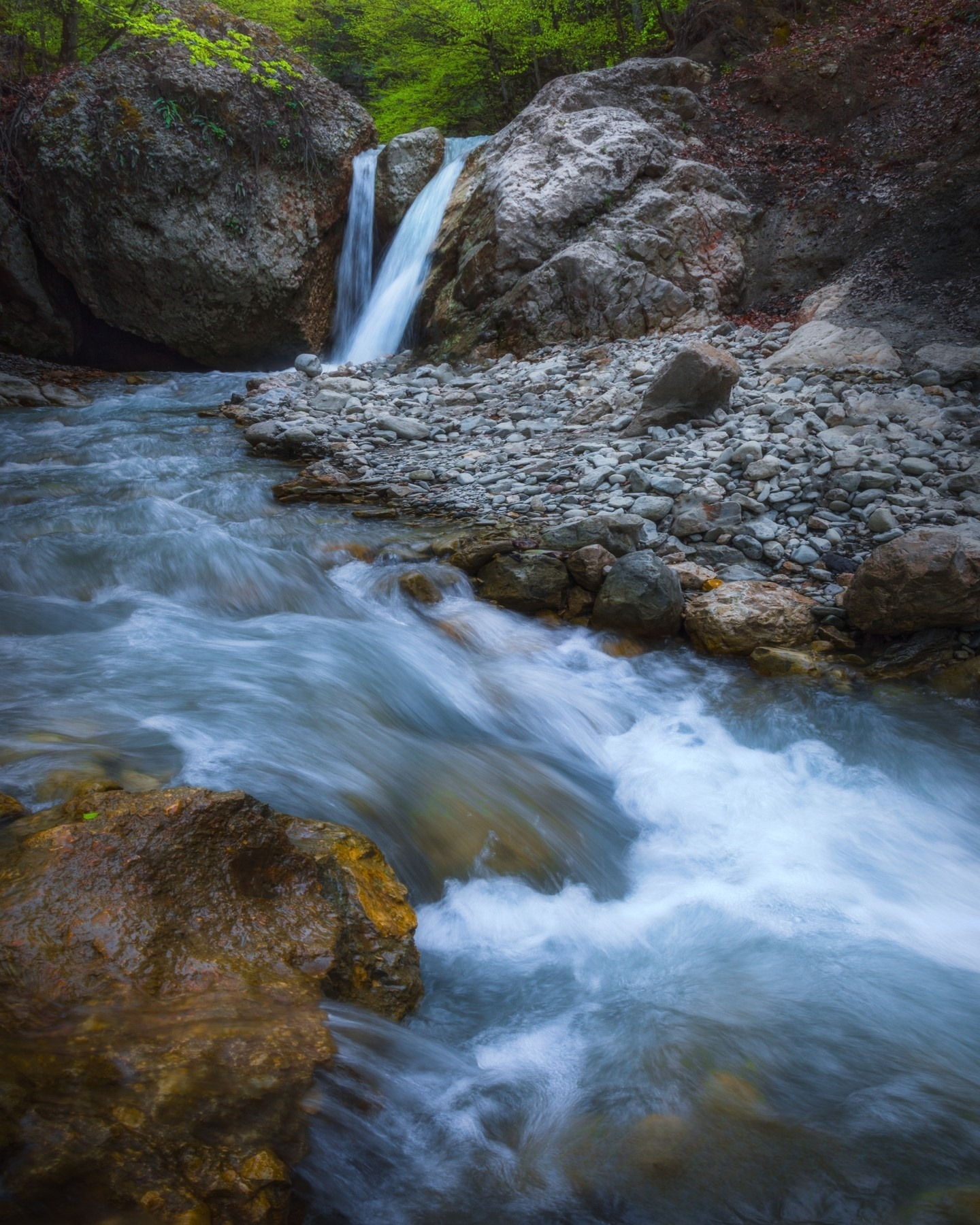
- Native name: Çağacıqçay (Azerbaijani)

Location
- Country: Azerbaijan

Physical characteristics
- Source: Greater Caucasus
- Mouth: Caspian Sea
  - coordinates: 41°25′56″N 49°01′10″E
- Length: 88 km (55 mi)

Chaghajikchay, Chagajugchay (Azerbaijani: Cağacıqqçay, Caqacuqçay) is a mountain river in the north of Azerbaijan, originating on the northeastern slopes of the Main Caucasian Range and flowing into the Caspian Sea. The length of the river is 70 km. The area of the drainage basin is 288 km². Water consumption - 1.8 m³/s. It is used for irrigation.

== Toponym ==
The hydronym "Chaghajikchay" is a synonym of the hydronym "Agdzhakchay" and means "cascade river" (Azerbaijani: çağlayan çay) or "rapidly flowing river". The name of the village Jagajug, located on the river, comes from the name of the river Chaghajikchay.

== Geography ==
The Chaghajikchay river flows through Guba and Khachmaz districts of the Republic of Azerbaijan. It originates on the territory of Guba district, on the northeastern slopes of the Greater Caucasus Range, on the Erfi Range, on the slope of Mount Bulud, at an altitude of 1780 m. It flows in a northeast direction through the villages of Zykhyr, Gurdeh, Khanagah, Meckekhaja, Rustov, Gam-gam, Sofikend, Yukhari Kardash, Ashagy Kardash, Pirvahid, Kuchay, Jagajug of Guba district and further through the villages of Kadimalikyshlak, Kalagan, Keyramaz, Arab, Ilkhychi of Khachmaz district and flows into the Caspian Sea.

== Geology ==
The Chaghajikchay river is fed by underground and sedimentary waters. The share of surface water varies from 4 to 10%.

The river basin is composed of deposits of the Sarmatian stage of the Upper Miocene, the total thickness of which reaches more than 1400 m. The thickness of the deposits of the lower Sarmatian stage within the river basin is 150 m.

== Gallery ==
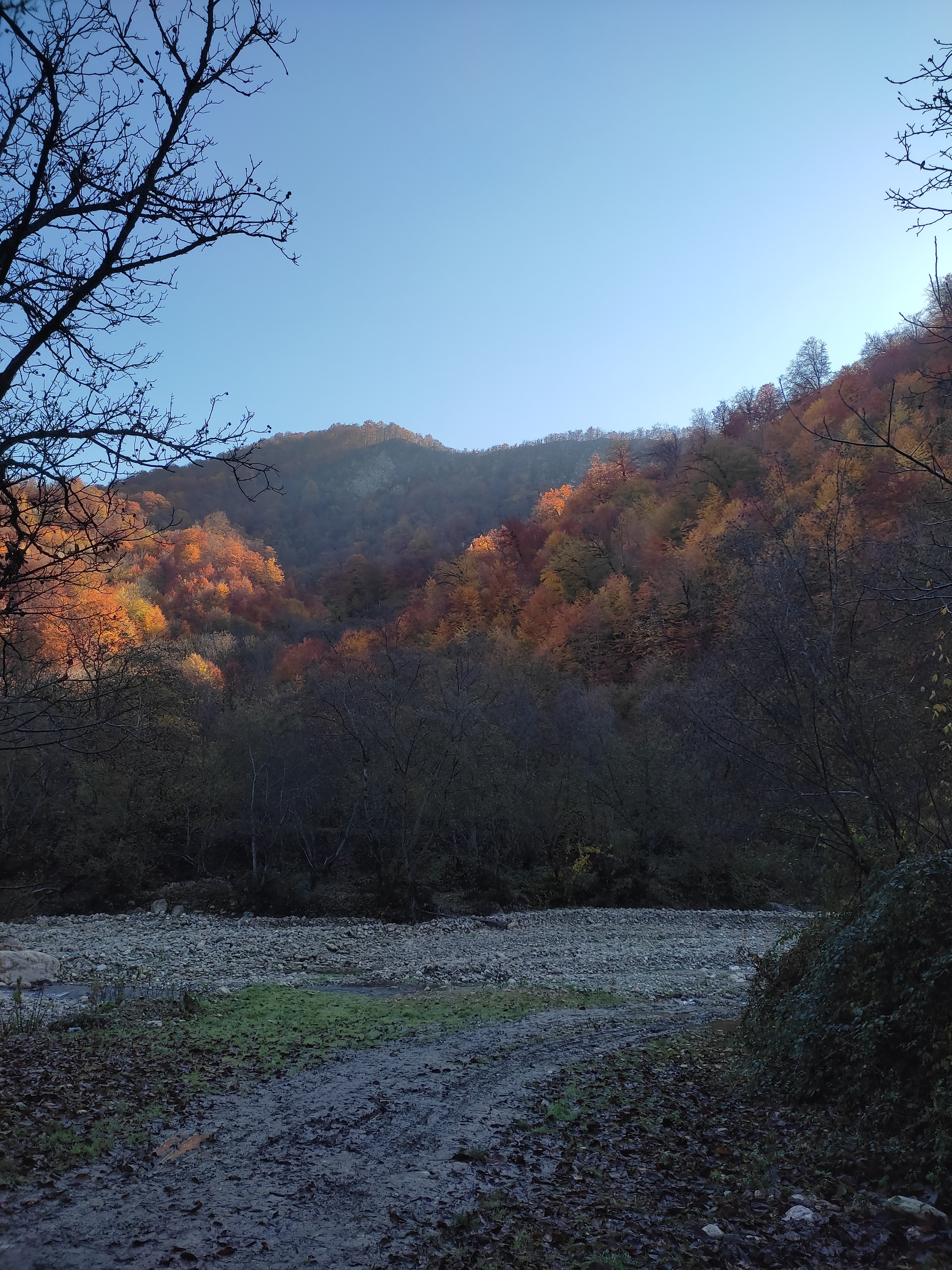
River valley in the south of Khanagah village

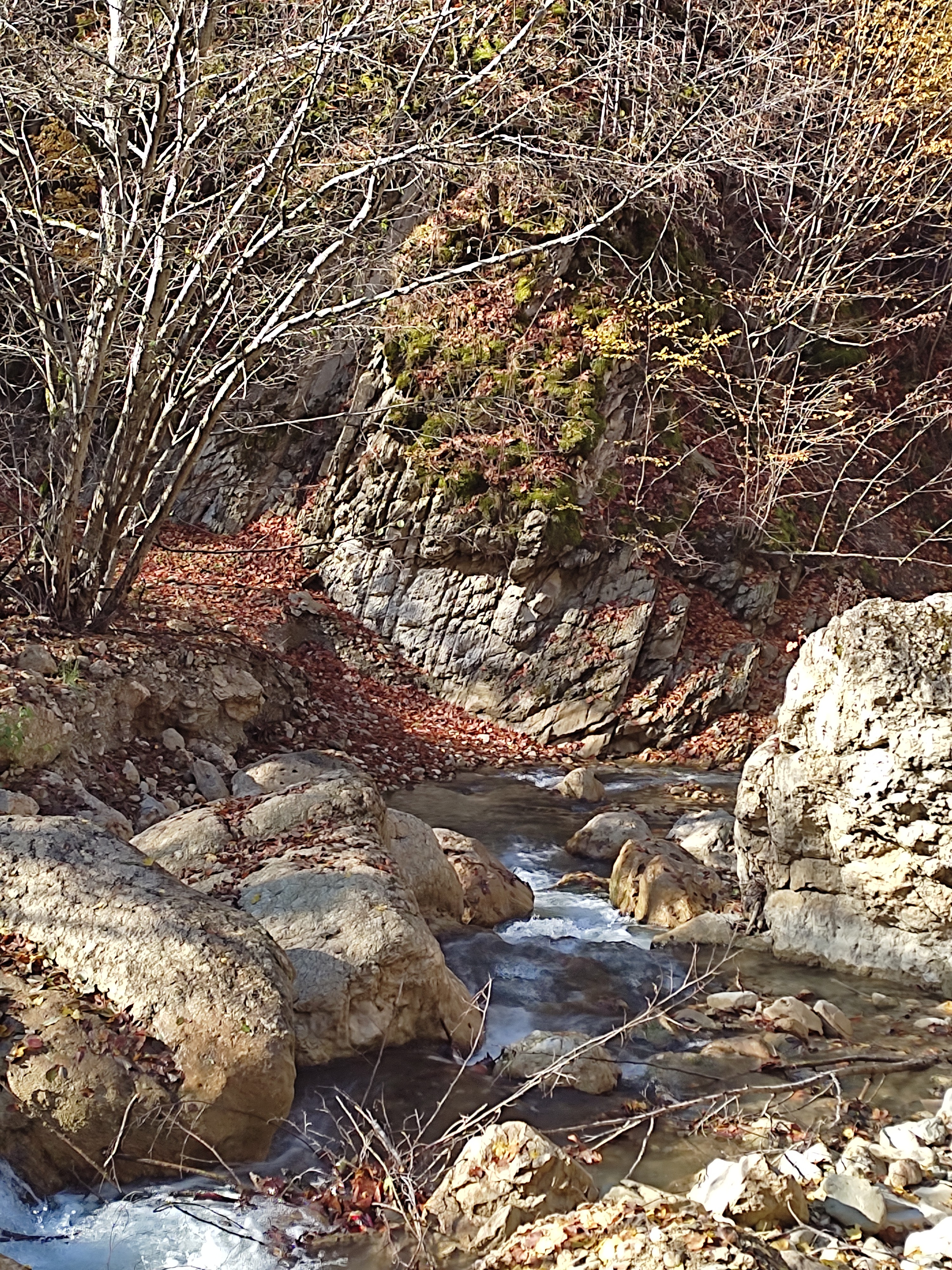
The upper reaches of the river in the south of the Khanagah village

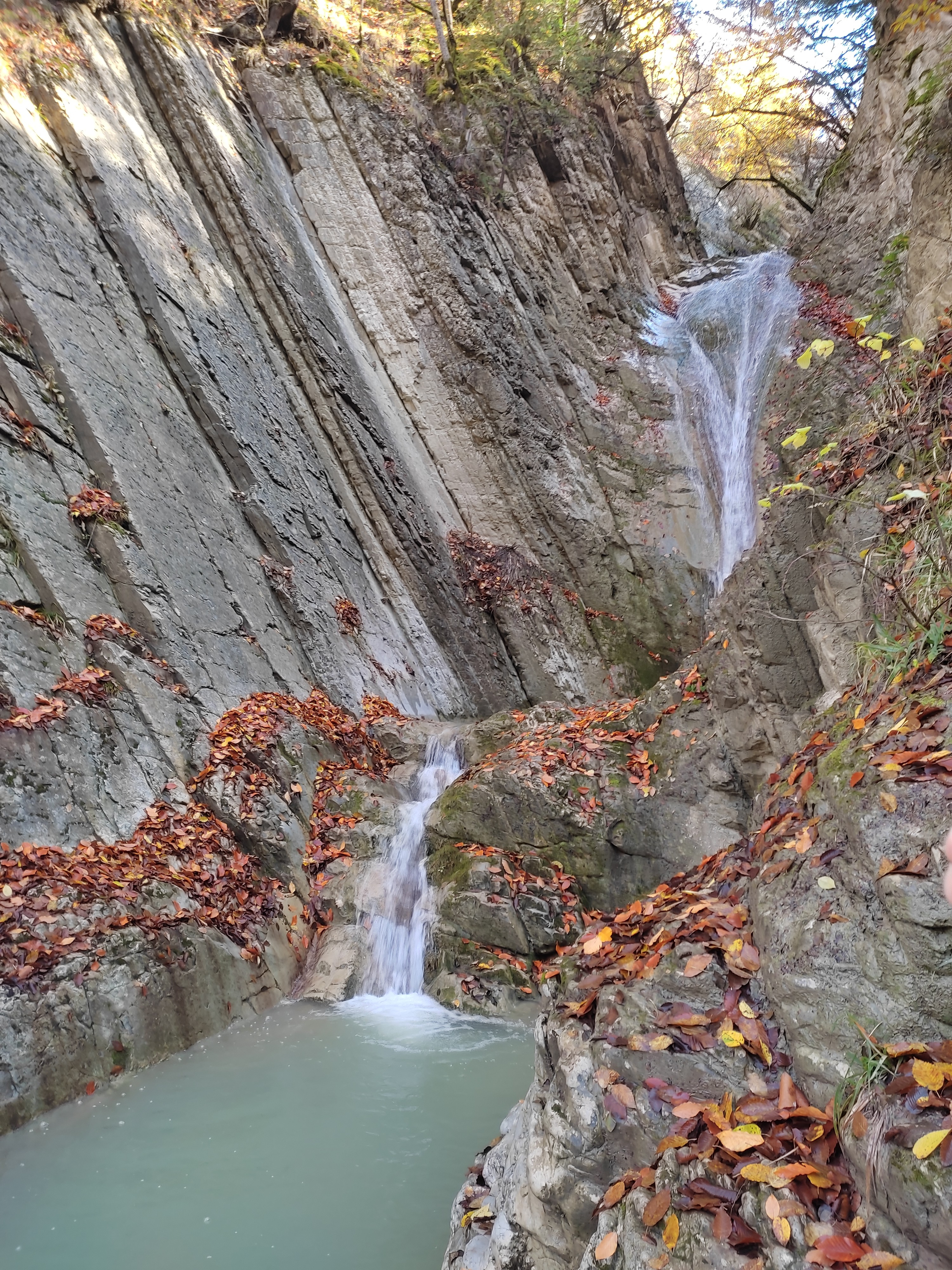
Khanagah waterfall on the river's right tributary in the south of the Khanagah village

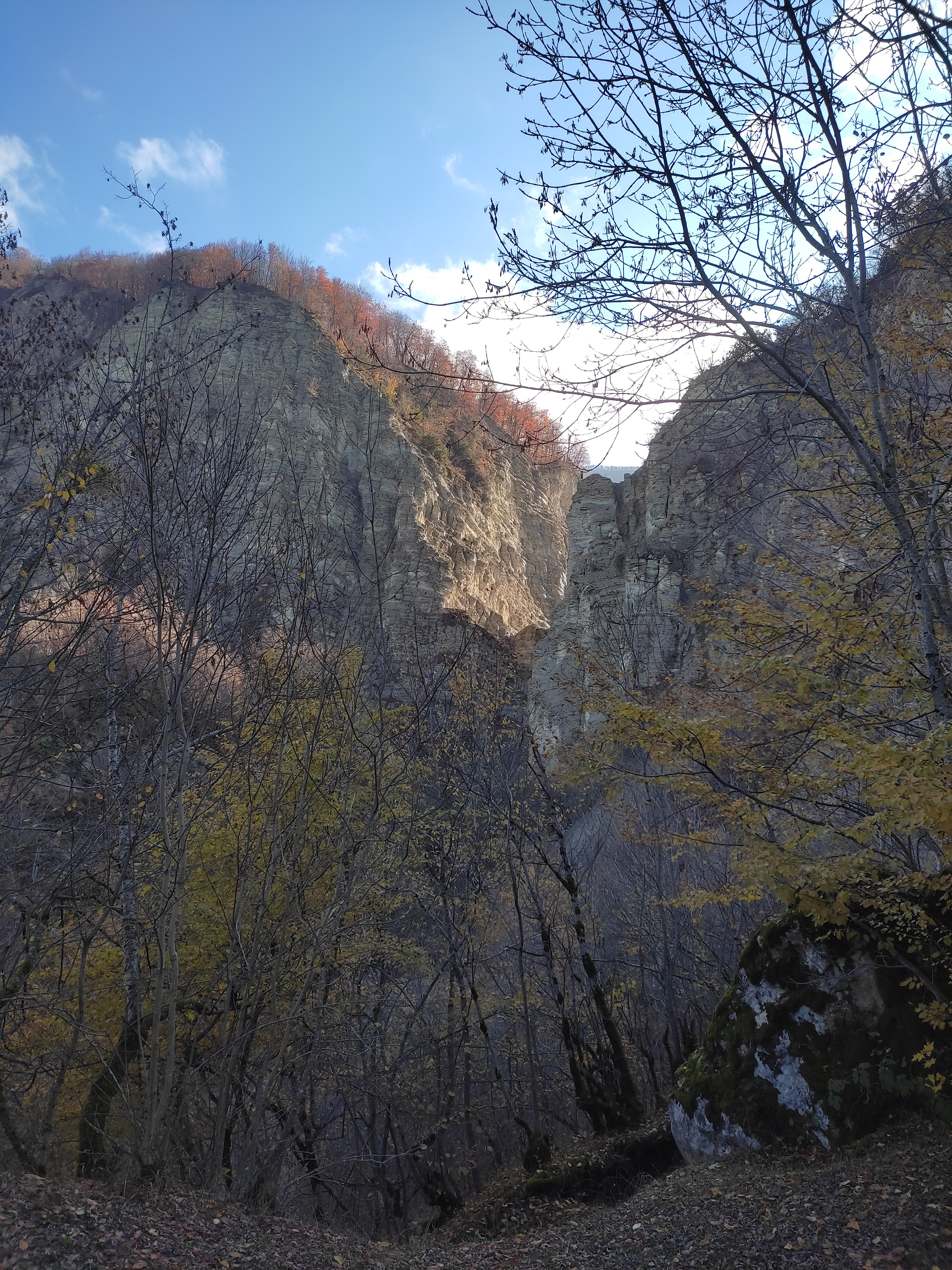
River valley in the south of the Gurdeh village
