= Mecke =

Mecke may refer to:

== People ==
- Dieter Mecke (1933–2013), German biochemist
- Karl-Conrad Mecke, iron cross recipient
- Reinhard Mecke (1895–1969), German physicist
- Walter Mecke, iron cross recipient

== Places ==
- Mecke Xace or Məçkə-Xacə, Azerbaijan

== Other ==
- Mecke reagent, used to identify alkaloids and other compounds
- Mecke (horse), Americvan Thoroughbred racehorse
