= Bunsen–Kirchhoff Award =

Chemistry award

- Description: Prize for outstanding achievements in the field of analytical spectroscopy
- Country: Germany
- Presented by: German Working Group for Applied Spectroscopy / PerkinElmer Germany
- Website: https://www.gdch.de/netzwerk-strukturen/fachstrukturen/analytische-chemie/arbeitskreise/ak-daas/bunsen-kirchhoff-preis.html

The Bunsen–Kirchhoff Award is a prize for "outstanding achievements" in the field of analytical spectroscopy. It has been awarded since 1990 by the German Working Group for Applied Spectroscopy, and is endowed with €2,500 by PerkinElmer, Germany. The prize is named in honor of chemist Robert Bunsen and physicist Gustav Kirchhoff.

== Prizewinners ==
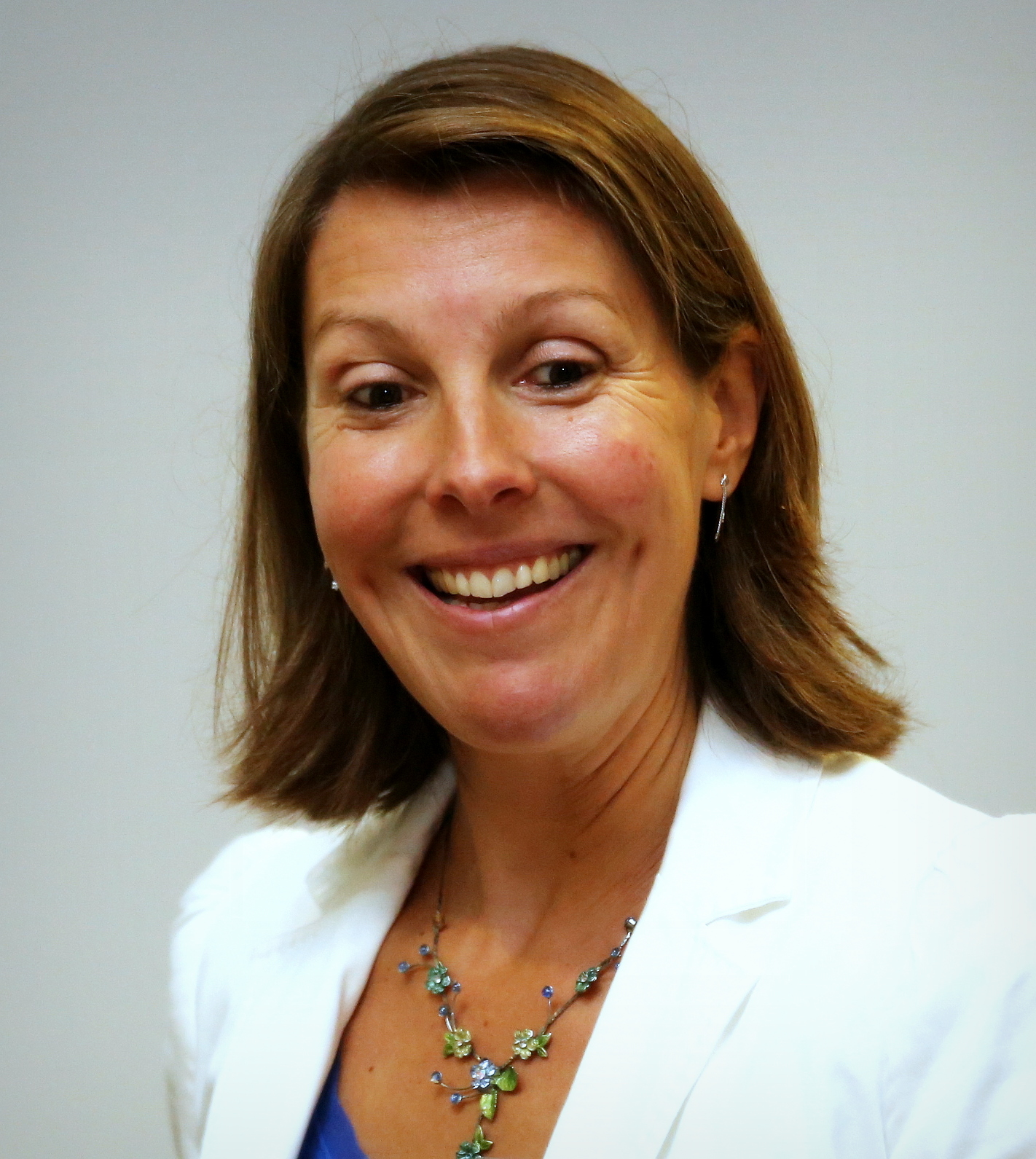
Bogaerts

- 1990 Günter Snatzke, Germany
- 1991 Hannes Aiginger, Austria; Peter Wobrauschek, Austria; Joachim Knoth, Germany; Heinrich Schwenke, Germany
- 1992 Kurt Laqua, Germany; Arnulf Röseler, Germany
- 1993 Boris L'vov, Russia
- 1994 D. Bruce Chase, United States; W. J. Orville-Thomas, Great Britain
- 1995 Paul W.J.M. Boumans, Netherlands
- 1998 Annemie Bogaerts, Belgium
- 2000 Dieter Fischer, Germany
- 2001 John A. McLean, United States
- 2002 Jürgen Popp, Germany
- 2003 Sergei Boulyga, Germany
- 2004 Ewa Bulska, Poland
- 2005 Nicolas Bings, Germany
- 2006 Volker Deckert, Germany
- 2007 Jörg Bettmer, Germany
- 2008 Sebastian Schlücke, Germany
- 2009 Joachim Koch, Switzerland
- 2010 Janina Kneipp, Germany
- 2011 Daniel Pröfrock, Germany
- 2012 Christoph Haisch, Germany
- 2013 Maria Montes-Bayón, Spain
- 2014 Oliver Reich, Germany
- 2015 Martín Resano, Spain
- 2016 Torsten Frosch, Germany
- 2017 Jacob T. Shelley, United States
- 2018 Zsuzsanna Heiner, Hungary
- 2020 Natalia P. Ivleva
- 2022 Carlos Abad Andrade
- 2024 Björn Meermann

== In popular culture ==
The Steely Dan song "What a Shame About Me" from the album Two Against Nature mentions that an old acquaintance, "won the Bunsen Prize".

== See also ==
- List of chemistry awards
