= EUCMOS =

EUCMOS is the abbreviation of the conference series "European Congress on Molecular Spectroscopy".

== Scope ==
The European Congress on Molecular Spectroscopy (EUCMOS) is held every two years. The first Congress in this series was held in Basel (Switzerland) in 1951. It focuses on all aspects of spectroscopic methods and techniques (including applications), as well as computational and theoretical approaches for the investigation of structure, dynamics, and properties of molecular systems.

This Congress covers various scientific topics including vibrational, electronic and rotational spectroscopies, spectroscopy of surfaces and interfaces, spectroscopy of biological molecules, computational methods in spectroscopy, applied spectroscopies (archaeology, geology, mineralogy, arts, environmental analysis, food analysis, and processing), new materials, and time-resolved spectroscopy.

== History ==
The European Molecular Spectroscopy Group, which was constituted informally after the Second World War to bring together spectroscopists from across Europe, met for the first time in Konstanz in 1947. Reinhard Mecke was at the time working in temporary accommodation at Wallhausen, a small village on the shores of Lake Constance, and the meeting (initiated by invitation of Professors Jean Lecomte and Alfred Kastler from Paris) was attended by French, German and Austrian spectroscopists.

However, the meeting which has since become regarded as the first of the EUCMOS series was organised under the auspices of Ernst Miescher in Basel in 1951, followed every two years by conferences in Paris (1953), Oxford (1955), Freiburg (1957), Bologna (1959), Amsterdam (1961), Budapest (1963), Copenhagen (1965), Madrid (1967) and Liége (1969). The next meeting was not held until 1973 when it was organized in Tallinn. The 1975 meeting in Strasbourg was devoted to the molecular spectroscopy of dense phases. The biennial meetings were perturbed for the second time in 1991 when EUCMOS XX, which was due to be held in Zagreb, had to be cancelled because of the Civil war in Yugoslavia. The following meeting, in Vienna, was brought forward by a year and the meetings have since been held in the even years. At EUCMOS XXII held in Essen (1994), William James Orville-Thomas retired as President of the International Committee and Austin Barnes was elected to this post. During his mandate, 11 conferences of the series were held, included the one organized in Coimbra in the Year 2000 (EUCMOS XXV). In EUCMOS XXXIII (2016, Szeged) Barnes retired as President of the International Committee and Rui Fausto (vice-President since EUCMOS XXVII, in Cracow, together with Henryk Ratajczak) was elected to this position. The new President had already been chosen as the organizer of the following EUCMOS meeting in Coimbra, 2018 (EUCMOS XXXIV). Sylvia Turrel and Michael Schmitt are the current vice-Presidents of the International Committee.

EUCMOS gathered over the years (present and future) Nobel prize winners from all areas of molecular physics as plenary speakers. This starts in 1953 with Alfred Kastler in Paris (Nobel prize 1966) followed by Gerhard Herzberg 1989 in Leipzig (Nobel prize 1971), Harold Kroto 2000 in Coimbra (Nobel prize 1996) and Theodor W. Hänsch 2010 in Florence (Nobel prize 2005).

== Overview ==
EUCMOS Meetings
Number	Year	Country	City	Organizer
0	1947	Germany	Konstanz	Mecke
I	1951	Switzerland	Basel	Miescher
II	1953	France	Paris	Lecomte/Kastler
III	1955	UK	Oxford	Thompson
IV	1957	Germany	Freiburg	Mecke
V	1959	Italy	Bologna	Mangini
VI	1961	The Netherlands	Amsterdam	Katelaar
VII	1963	Hungary	Budapest	Kovacs
VIII	1965	Denmark	Copenhagen	Bak
IX	1967	Spain	Madrid	Morcillo
X	1969	Belgium	Liége	Rosen
XI	1973	USSR	Tallinn	El'yashevich
XII	1975	France	Strasbourg	Lecomte
XIII	1977	Poland	Wrocław	Ratajczak
XIV	1979	Germany	Frankfurt	Müller/Comes
XV	1981	UK	Norwich	Orville-Thomas
XVI	1983	Bulgaria	Sofia	Jordanov
XVII	1985	Spain	Madrid	Hidalgo
XVIII	1987	The Netherlands	Amsterdam	Oskam
XIX	1989	Germany (DDR)	Dresden	Steger
XX*	1991	Croatia	Zagreb	Meic
XXI	1992	Austria	Vienna	Kellner
XXII	1994	Germany	Essen	Schrade
XXIII	1996	Hungary	Balatonfüred	Mink
XXIV	1998	Czech Republic	Prague	Volka
XXV	2000	Portugal	Coimbra	Fausto
XXVI	2002	France	Lille	Turrel
XXVII	2004	Poland	Cracow	Handke/Ratajczak
XXVIII	2006	Turkey	Istanbul	Akiüz
XXIX	2008	Croatia	Opatia	Musić/Furić
XXX	2010	Italy	Florence	Schettino
XXXI	2012	Romania	Cluj-Napoca	Aştilean/Chiş/Cozar
XXXII	2014	Germany	Düsseldorf	Schmitt
XXXVIII	2016	Hungary	Szeged	Palinko
XXXIV	2018	Portugal	Coimbra	Fausto
XXXV	2020	Finland	Jyväskylä	Lundell

* Not held because of the civil war in Yugoslavia.
