= Bağçalı =

- Municipality
- Location within Azerbaijan
- Country: Azerbaijan
- Rayon: Quba

Population (2009)
  - Total: 656
- Time zone: UTC+4 (AZT)
  - Summer (DST): UTC+5 (AZT)

Bağçalı (also, Bağçaəli) is a village in the municipality of Rustov in the Quba Rayon of Azerbaijan.
