= William James Orville-Thomas =

British chemist (1921–2009)

William James Orville-Thomas (13 October 1921 – 23 November 2009) was a British physical chemist. He was born at Llanelli, near Swansea. In 1966, he was appointed to the Chair of Physical Chemistry at the University of Salford. Orville-Thomas is author of several books on infrared spectroscopy, such as "The Structure of Small Molecules" (1966) and "Internal Rotation in Molecules" (1974). In 1967 he was the founding editor of the Journal of Molecular Structure and in 1985 (with I. G. Csizmadia) of the Journal of Molecular Structure: THEOCHEM.

Orville-Thomas served as president of the international committee of the European Congress on Molecular Spectroscopy (EUCMOS) until 1994.

He died in November 2009.
