= Khanagah Mosque =

Former mosque in Quba, Azerbaijan

- Azerbaijani: Xanəgah Məscidi
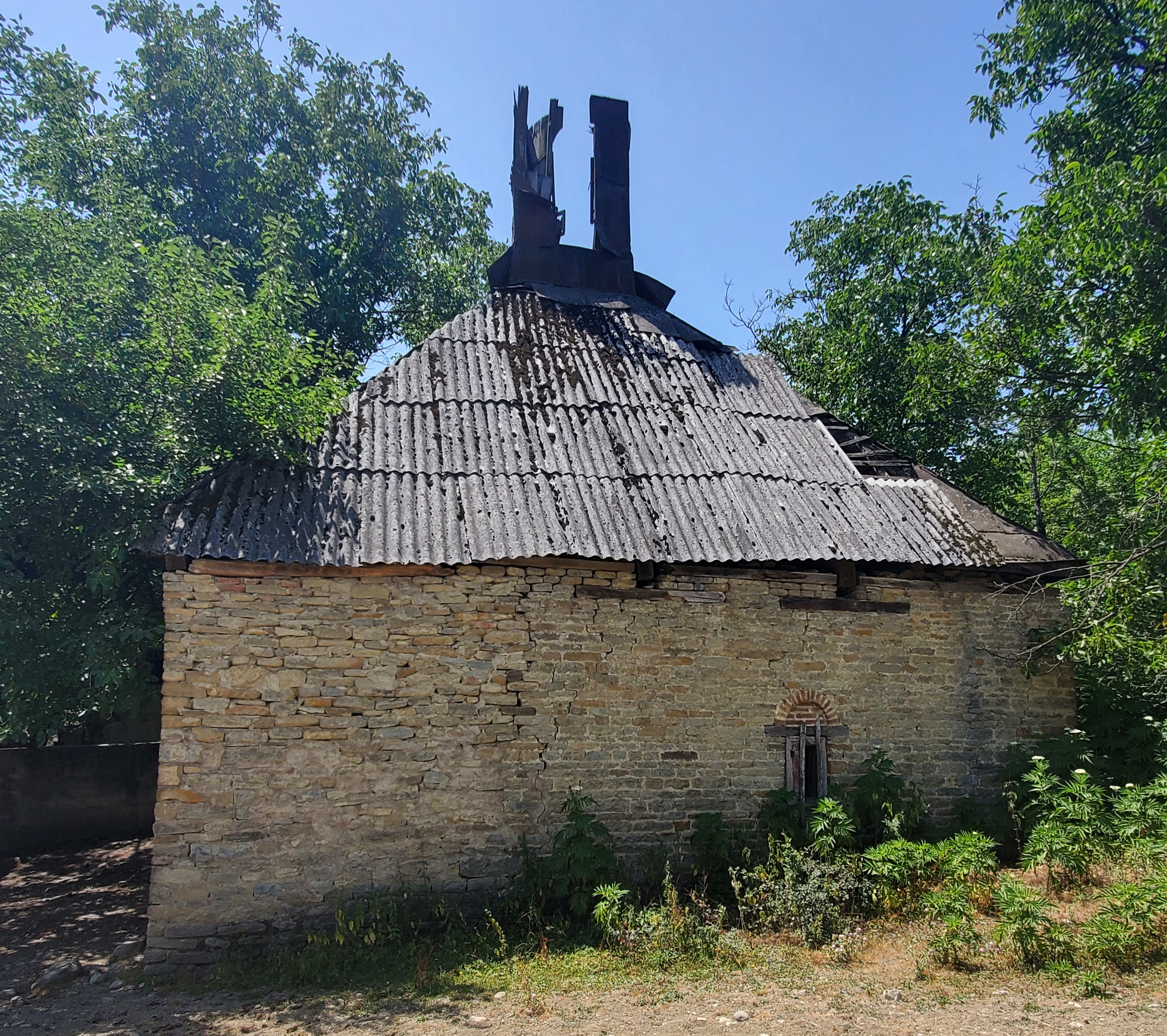
- The former mosque in 2022

- Location of the former mosque in Azerbaijan

Religion
- Affiliation: Islam (former)
- Ecclesiastical or organizational status: Mosque (19th century–1928); Profane use (1928–1992)
- Status: Abandoned (ruinous state)

Location
- Location: Khanagah village, Quba
- Country: Azerbaijan
- Interactive map of Khanagah Mosque
- Coordinates: 41°13′11″N 48°32′47″E

Architecture
- Type: Mosque architecture
- Completed: 19th century

Specifications
- Minaret: One (since destroyed)
- Materials: Stone; bricks; timber; tiles

The Khanagah Mosque (Azerbaijani: Xanəgah Məscidi) is a former mosque and historical architectural monument, located in the Khanagah village of Quba District, Azerbaijan.

Completed in the 19th century, the former mosque was included in the list of immovable historical and cultural monuments of local significance by the Decision No. 132 of the Cabinet of Ministers of the Republic of Azerbaijan, dated August 2, 2001.

== History ==
The Khanagah Mosque in the Khanagah village of Quba District was built in the 19th century. The construction utilized locally sourced rubble stone and lime mortar, with baked bricks and standard rubble stones in some sections. The thickness of the mosque's walls ranges between 60 and 80 cm (24 and 31 in). The mosque's ceiling was constructed using wood, and its roof was covered with tiles. The minaret was situated at the central part of the ceiling.

After the Soviet occupation of Azerbaijan, a formal campaign against religion began in 1928. In December of that year, the Central Committee of the Azerbaijani Communist Party transferred numerous mosques, churches, and synagogues to clubs for use in educational and cultural activities. While there were 3,000 mosques in Azerbaijan in 1917, this number fell to 1,700 by 1927 and plummeted to just 17 by 1933. The Khanagah Mosque was closed during this period, and its building was repurposed as a warehouse. The mosque's minbar was destroyed, and its internal books and some documents were lost.

After Azerbaijan regained its independence, the Khanagah Mosque was included in the list of immovable historical and cultural monuments of local significance by Resolution No. 132 of the Cabinet of Ministers of the Republic of Azerbaijan, dated August 2, 2001. However, due to a prolonged lack of maintenance and disuse, the mosque's structure fell into disrepair. The roof and parts of the walls collapsed over time, leaving the building in a state of ruin.

== Gallery ==
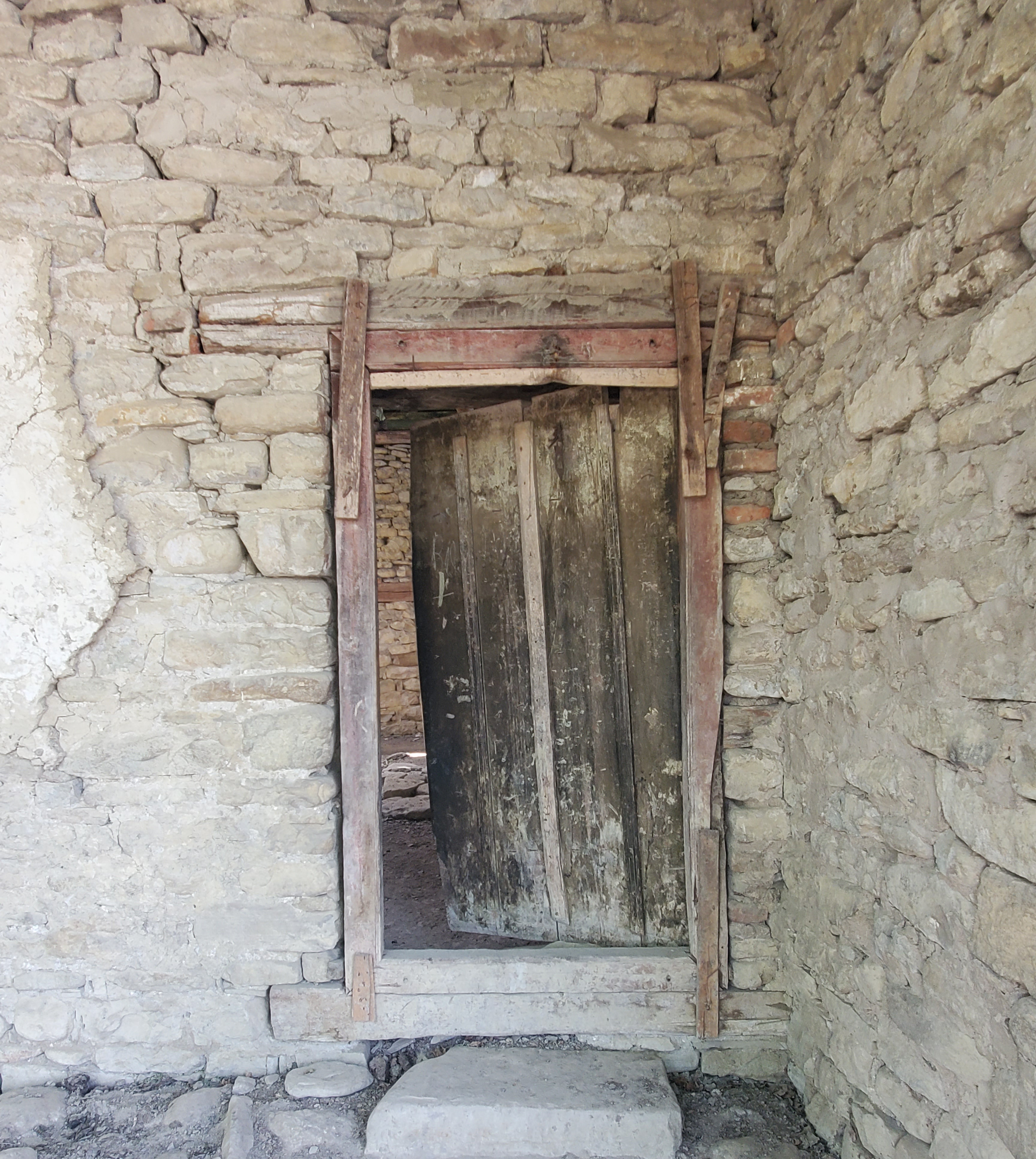

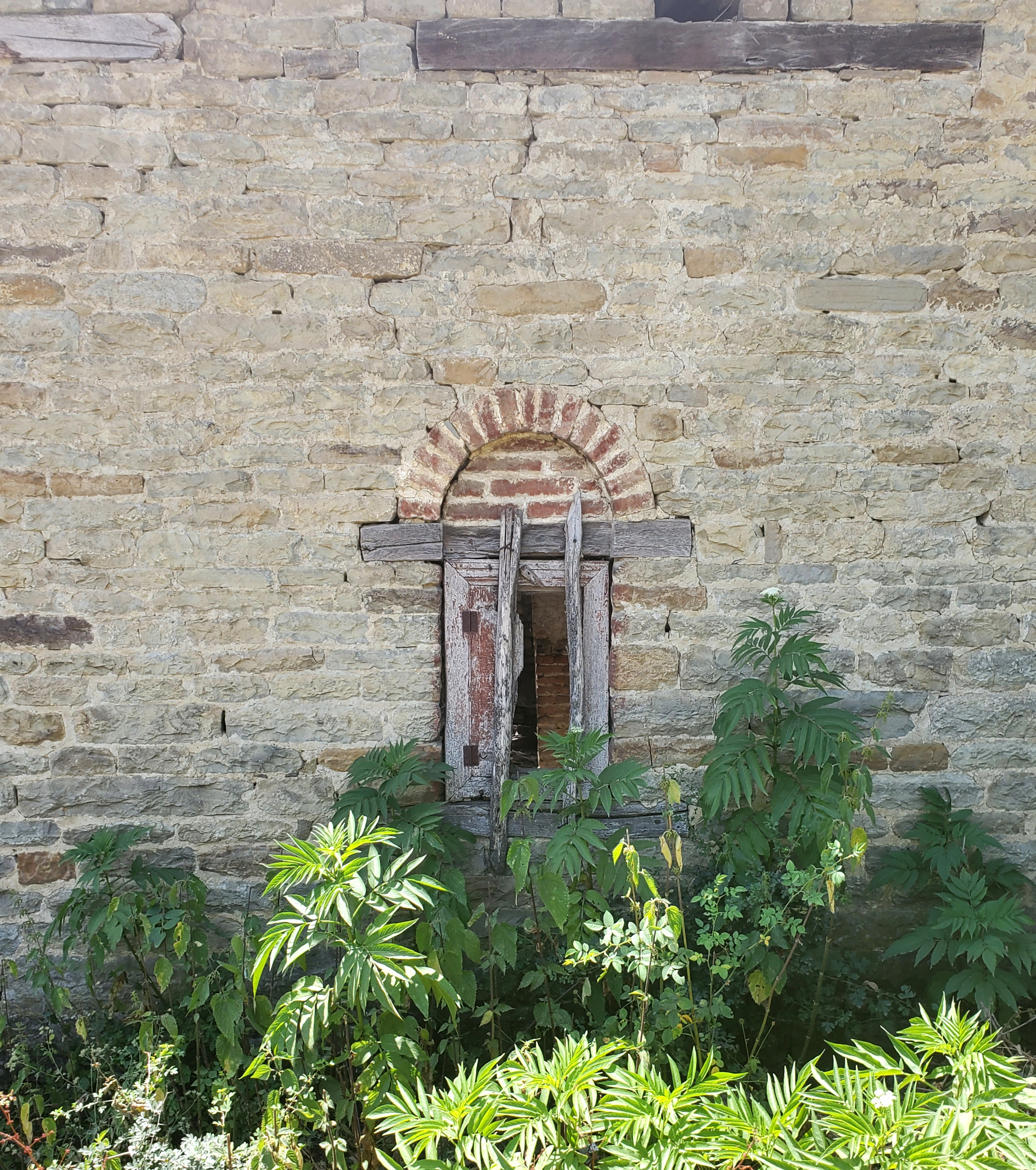

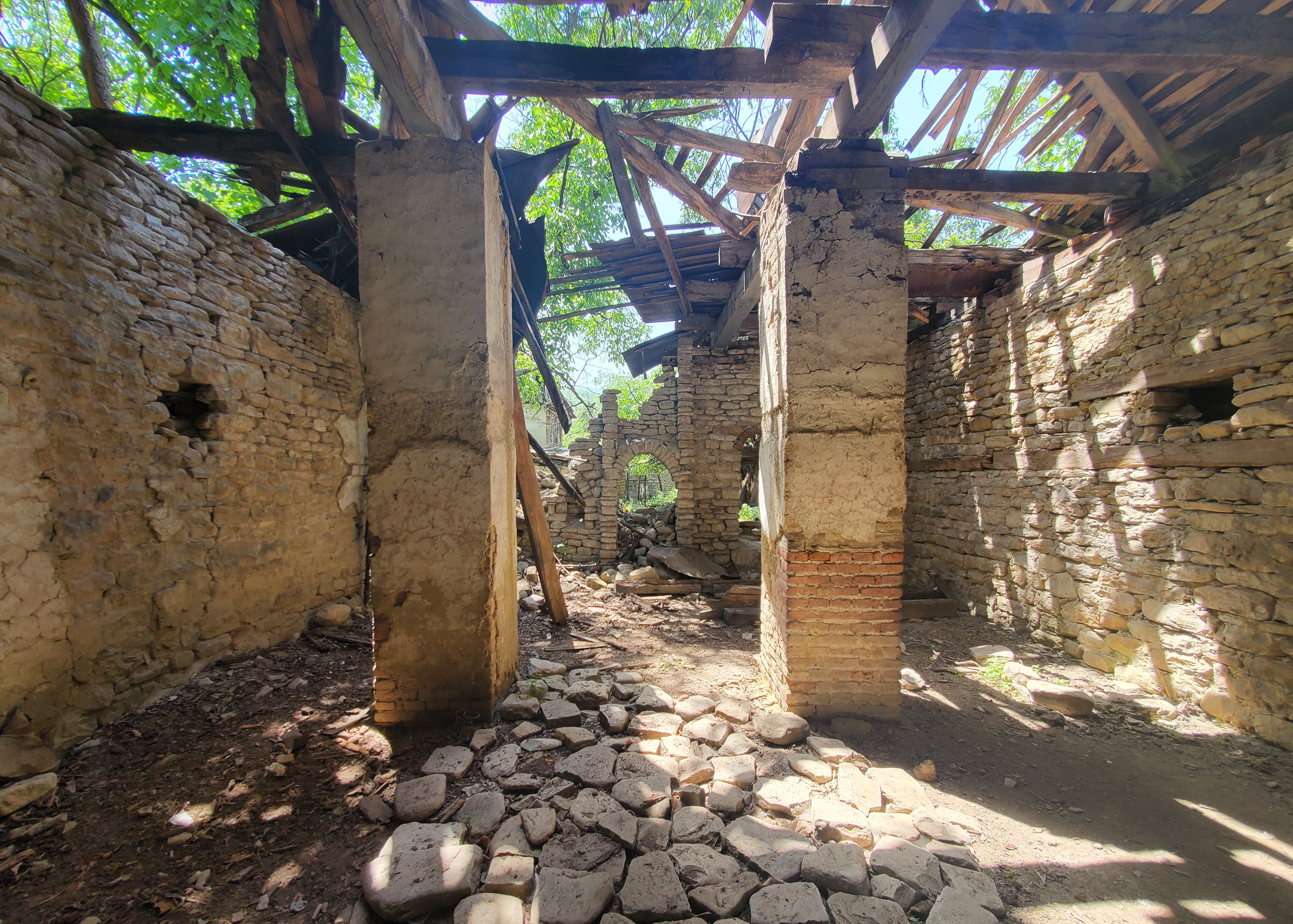

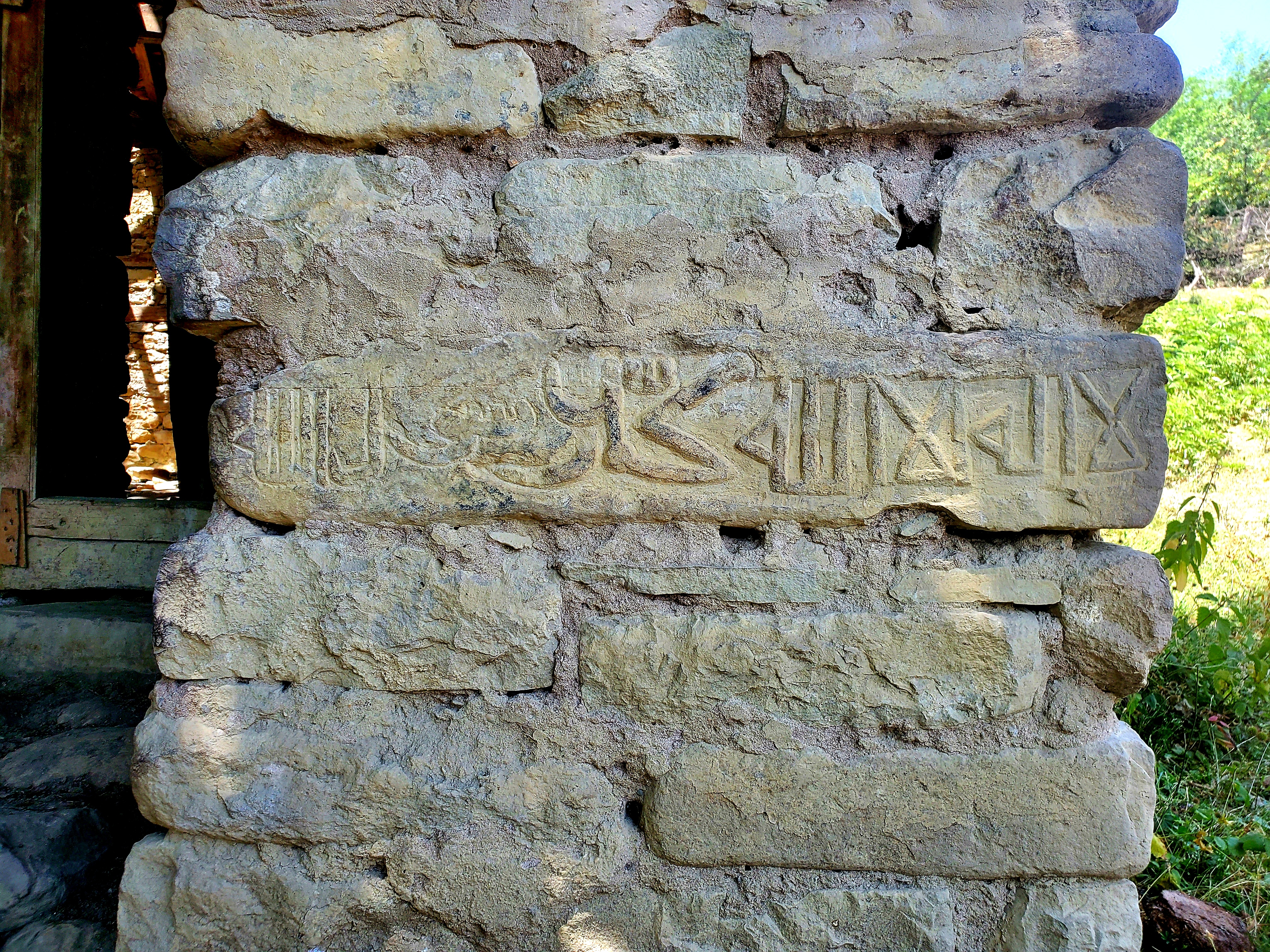

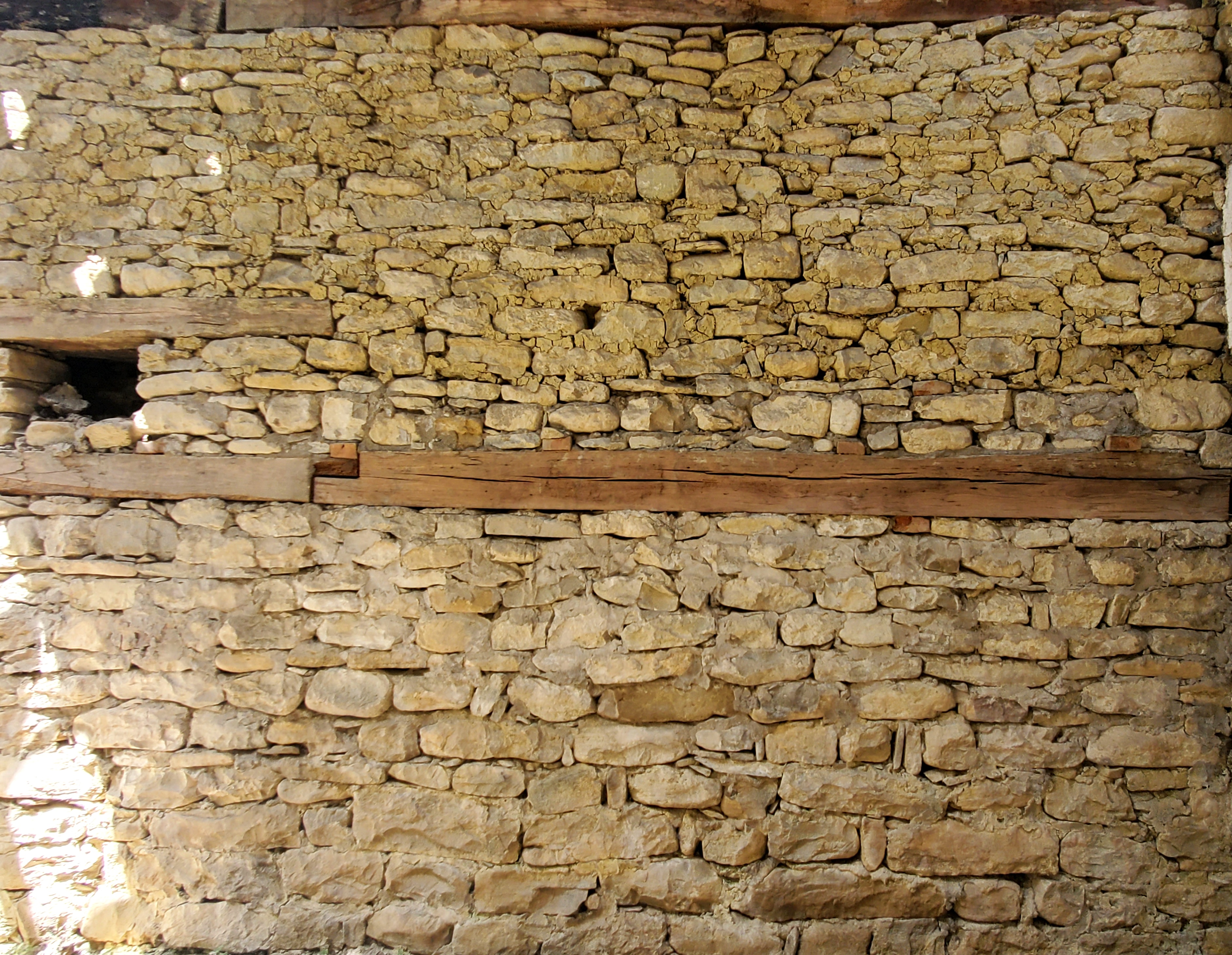

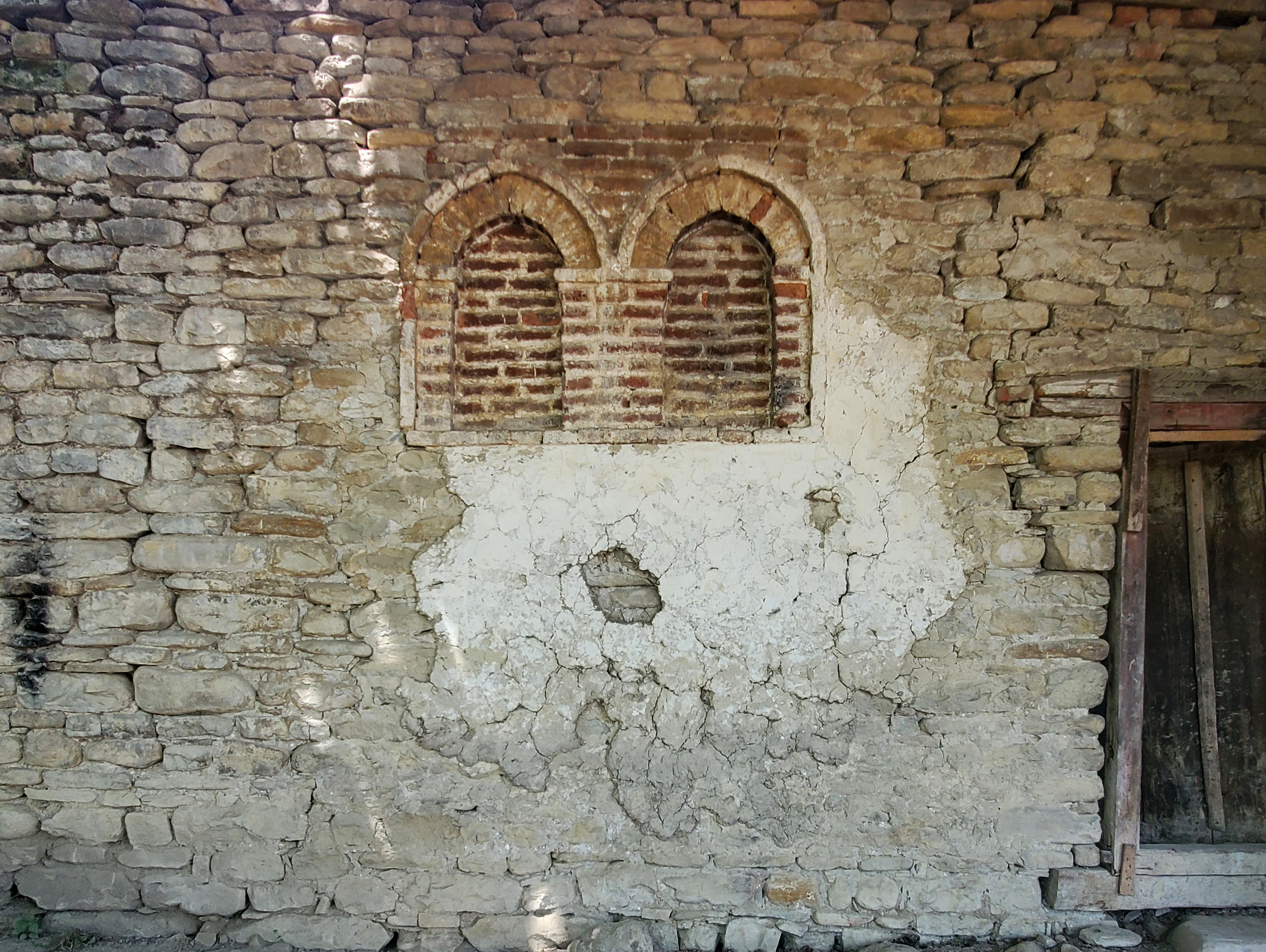

== See also ==
- Islam in Azerbaijan
- List of mosques in Azerbaijan
