= Jean Lecomte =

French physicist

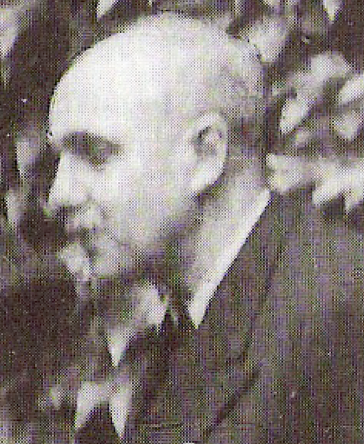
Jean Lecomte at the 2nd EUCMOS in Paris 1953

Jean Lecomte (August 5, 1898 - March 28, 1979) was a French physicist, researcher and professor of physics at CNRS.

== Career ==
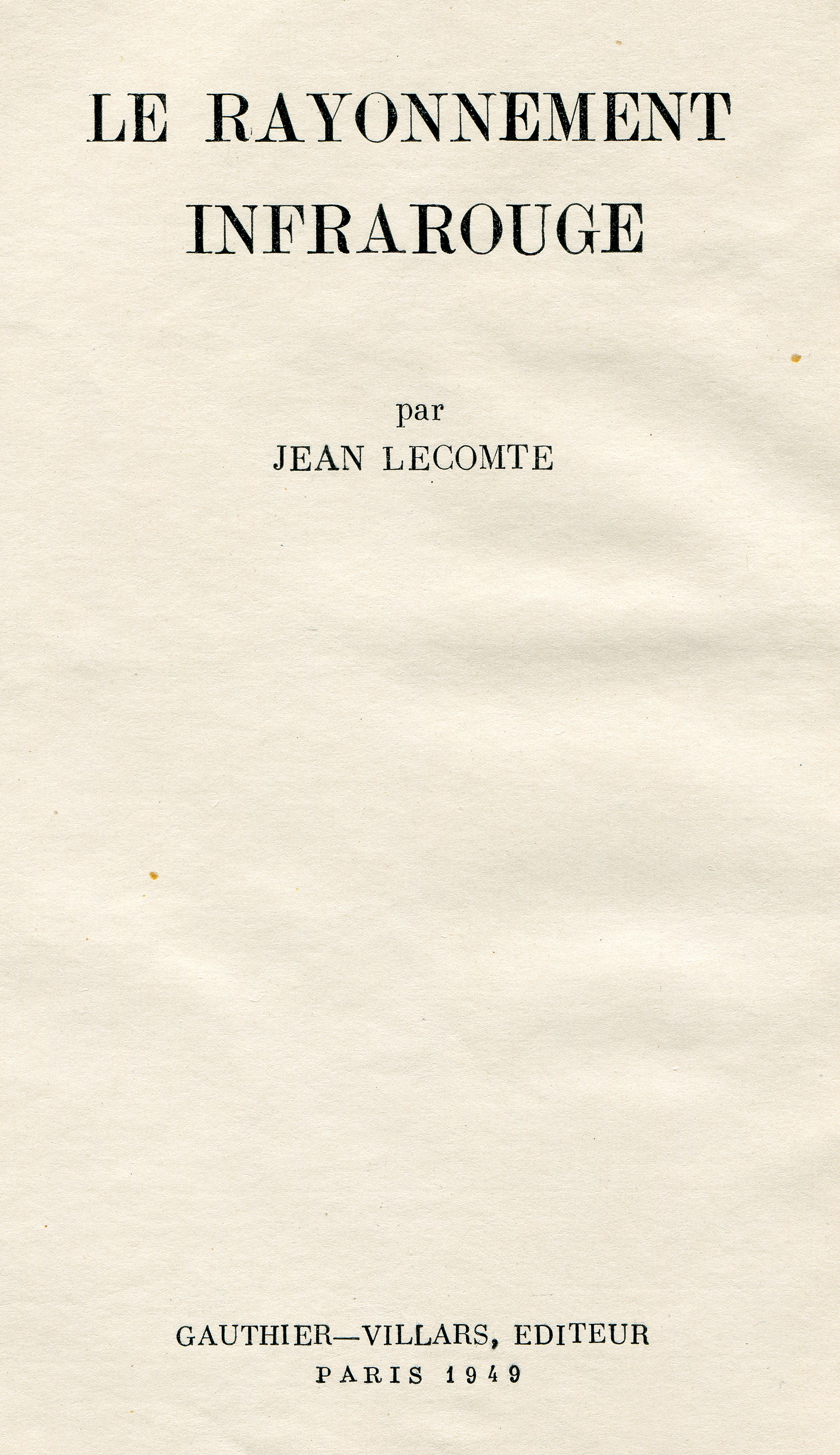

In 1919, Lecomte started working in the laboratory of physical research at the Sorbonne in Paris. Lecomte presented his Doctoral Thesis in 1924 on localized vibrations in molecules. He was one of the founding members of the European Congress on Molecular Spectroscopy (EUCMOS), together with French Nobel prize winning physicist Alfred Kastler (Paris) and German physicist Reinhard Mecke (Konstanz). Lecomte was elected as a member of the French Academy of Sciences (Physics Section) in 1959 and as president of the French Association for the Advancement of Science (L’Association française pour l’avancement des sciences) in 1968. He authored several books on Infrared spectroscopy.
