= Cundari =

Cundari is a surname. Notable people with the surname include:

- Emilia Cundari (1930–2005), American soprano opera singer
- Mark Cundari (born 1990), Canadian ice hockey player
- Thomas R. Cundari (born 1964), American professor
