= Kələbaq =

Human settlement in Azerbaijan

Coordinates: 41.24426°N 48.59303°E

Kələbaq (also, Kələbağ) is a village in the municipality of Rustov in the Quba Rayon of Azerbaijan.
