= Harold Thompson (chemist) =

English chemist and football administrator

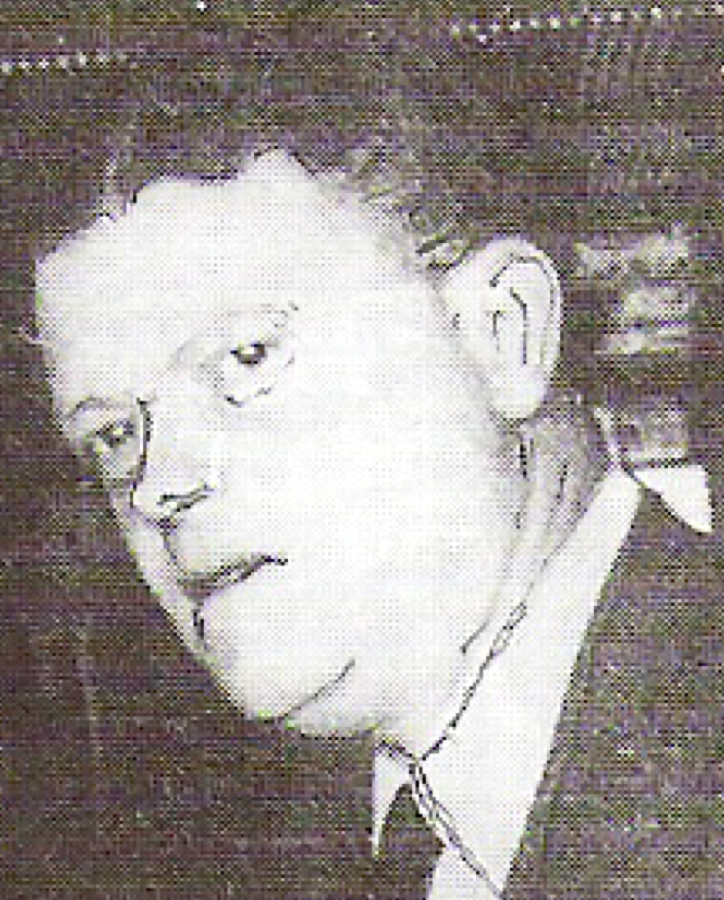
Harold Warris Thompson 1951 at EUCMOS I in Basel

Sir Harold Warris Thompson, CBE, FRS (15 February 1908 – 31 December 1983) was an English physical chemist and spectroscopist, who also served as chairman of the Football Association.

== Early life and education ==
Harold Thompson was born in Wombwell, Yorkshire, the son of William Thompson, a colliery executive, and Charlotte Emily. He was educated at King Edward VII School in Sheffield, then at Trinity College, Oxford, where he was tutored by Cyril Norman Hinshelwood.

== Chemistry ==
Thompson graduated in 1929 and worked with Fritz Haber and Max Planck in Berlin. He returned to Oxford in 1930 after receiving a Ph.D. from the Friedrich Wilhelm University of Berlin. He was a Fellow and later Vice-President of St John's College, Oxford.

His research interests included chemical reactions in gases, photochemistry and spectroscopy. During the Second World War he worked on infra-red spectroscopy for the Ministry of Aircraft Production, and afterwards continued research in this field.

Thompson was described as an inspiring teacher. His students at Oxford included Margaret Thatcher, whom he taught when she was a chemistry student.

== Football Association ==
Thompson was an avid football player, earning a blue in his final year at Oxford. He was involved with Oxford University Association Football Club for most of his life, helping to establish the Varsity match at Wembley. He established the Pegasus Club in 1948. He was chairman of the Football Association (1976–1981). One former FA official said of him, "Sir Harold was a bullying autocrat. He was a bastard. He treated the staff like shit".

Thompson played a major role in the sacking of World Cup-winning England manager Sir Alf Ramsey in 1974. Given England's failure to qualify for the World Cup that year, Ramsey's dismissal may have been justified, but the newspapers reported that "the whole episode was handled with brutal insensitivity."

British journalist and author Leo McKinstry wrote that "England's most successful manager would have had a legacy fit for a hero had it not been for the malevolence of the FA chief Harold Thompson."

Thompson subsequently ensured that one of the most successful club managers of the time, Brian Clough, never became England manager.

== Honours ==
Thompson received many honours, and was elected a Fellow of the Royal Society in 1946. He was appointed Commander of the Order of the British Empire (CBE) in the 1959 New Year Honours and knighted in the 1968 New Year Honours. Thompson was also made a Chevalier of the Légion d’honneur in 1971.

In 1981, Thompson became a founding member of the World Cultural Council.

Thompson co-edited the journal Spectrochimica Acta Part A for 30 years. In 1985, the journal dedicated the entirety of Volume 41 to Thompson's memory. The volume included articles by many of his students, colleagues and admirers and also included special reminiscences from prominent colleagues, including Richard C. Lord and Foil A. Miller.

In 1986, Spectrochimica Acta Part A established the "Sir Harold Thompson Memorial Award," awarded annually to the authors of the article representing "the most significant advance reported during the preceding year."

== Personal life ==
Thompson married Grace Penelope Stradling in 1938 and they had two children. He died on 31 December 1983.
