= Ernst Miescher =

Swiss physicist (1905–1990)

Ernst Miescher (6 October 1905 Basel, Switzerland – 27 September 1990, Basel) was a Swiss physicist.

Miescher studied physics in Basel and Munich, with a 1930 doctorate, and 1935 habilitation in Basel. During 1929–42 he was assistant at the "Physikalische Anstalt" of the University of Basel. From 1941 to 1945 he was extraordinary professor for experimental physics, in particular for spectroscopy at the University of Basel. From 1945 to 1972 he was head of the department of spectral physics at the University of Basel. Miescher was the local organizer of the first EUCMOS in 1951.
