= Dalıqaya =

- Location within Azerbaijan
- Coordinates: 41°10′N 48°26′E
- Country: Azerbaijan
- Rayon: Quba
- Municipality: Zıxır
- Time zone: UTC+4 (AZT)
  - Summer (DST): UTC+5 (AZT)

Dalıqaya (also, Dəli-qaya, Dəliqaya, and Dalikaya) is a village in the Quba Rayon of Azerbaijan. The village forms part of the municipality of Zıxır.
