= Qaracıq =

Human settlement in Azerbaijan

Coordinates: 41°22′N 48°45′E

Qaracıq (also, Qaracık and Qaracek) is a village in the municipality of Qaracik Zeyid in the Khachmaz Rayon of Azerbaijan.
