= Cındar =

Human settlement in Azerbaijan

Coordinates: 41°16′N 48°34′E

Cındar is a village in the municipality of Rustov in the Quba Rayon of Azerbaijan.
