= Qaracik Zeyid =

Garajik Zeyid
- Municipality
- Azerbaijani: Qaracik Zeyid
- Location within Azerbaijan
- Coordinates: 41°22′50″N 48°45′04″E
- Country: Azerbaijan
- District: Khachmaz

Population
  - Total: 1,039
- Time zone: UTC+4 (AZT)
  - Summer (DST): UTC+5 (AZT)

Qaracik Zeyid (also, Garajik Zeyid) is a village and municipality in the Khachmaz District of Azerbaijan. It has a population of 1,039. The municipality consists of the villages of Garajik Zeyid, Qədiməlikqışlaq, and Qaracıq.
