= Hacıağalar =

Human settlement in Azerbaijan

Coordinates: 41°14′N 48°36′E

Hacıağalar (also, Hacağalar) is a village in the municipality of Qamqam in the Quba Rayon of Azerbaijan.
