= Rustov mosque =

Former mosque in Rustov, Quba, Azerbaijan

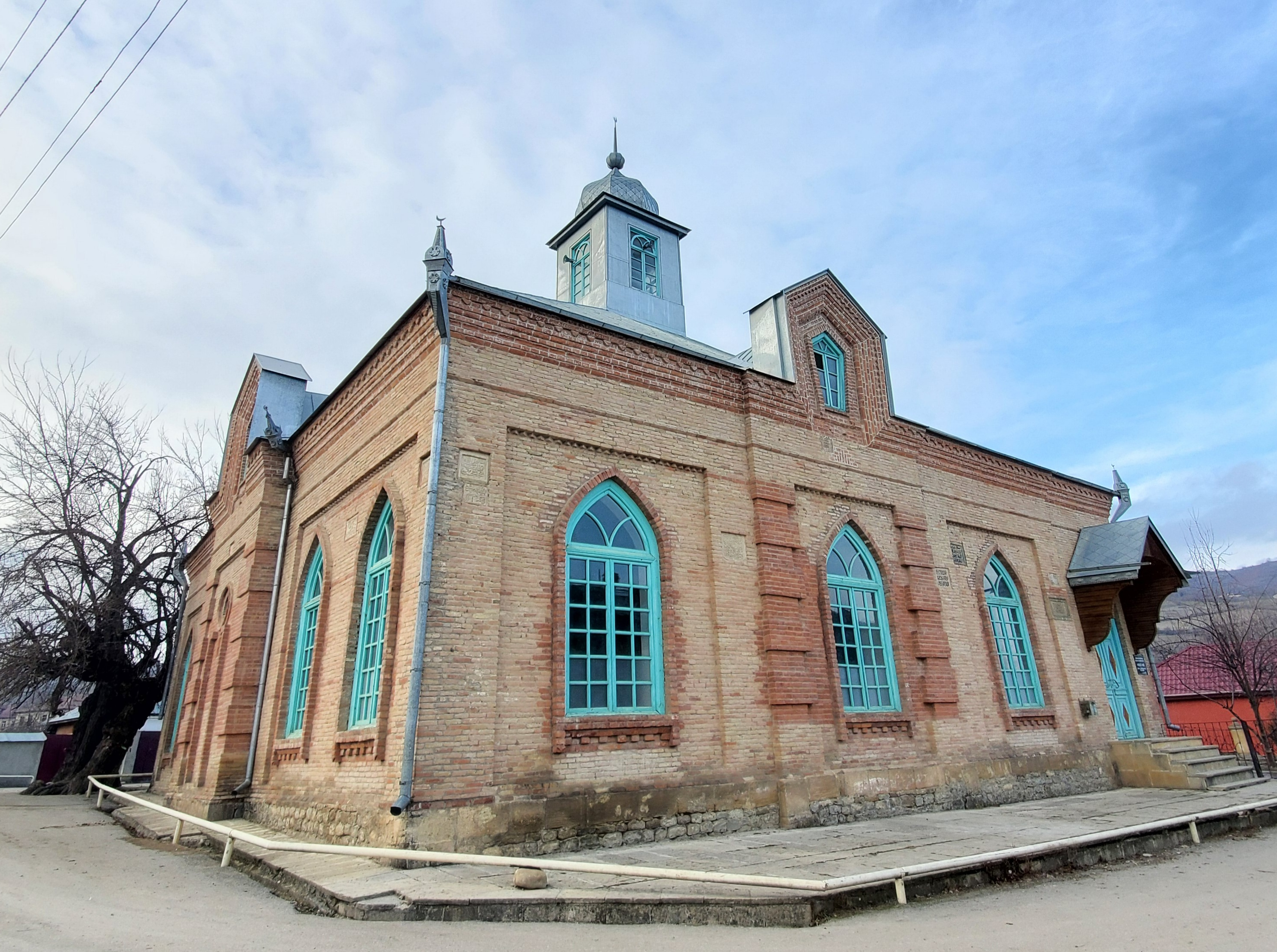
- The former mosque in 2021

- Location of the former mosque in Azerbaijan

Religion
- Affiliation: Islam (former)
- Ecclesiastical or organizational status: Mosque (1903–1928); Profane use (1928–1991); Mosque (1991–????)
- Status: Inactive (as a mosque)

Location
- Location: Rustov, Quba
- Country: Azerbaijan
- Interactive map of Rustov mosque
- Coordinates: 41°15′8″N 48°34′37″E

Architecture
- Type: Mosque architecture
- Style: Islamic
- Funded by: Haji Zeynalabdin Tagiyev
- Completed: 1903
- Inscriptions: One
- Materials: Stone; limestone; brick; timber

The Rustov mosque is a former mosque and historical architectural monument, located in the village of Rustov, in the Guba district of Azerbaijan. The former mosque was built in 1903 with the help of Haji Zeynalabdin Tagiyev.

The former mosque was included in the list of immovable historical and cultural monuments of local importance by decision No. 132 issued by the Cabinet of Ministers of the Republic of Azerbaijan on August 2, 2001.

The monument was restored in 2008.

== History ==
The Rustov village former mosque was built in 1903 with the help of philanthropist Haji Zeynalabdin Taghiyev.

=== During the Soviet occupation ===
After the Soviet occupation, they began to fight against religion at an official speed since 1928. In December of the same year, the Central Committee of the Communist Party of Azerbaijan handed over many mosques, churches and synagogues to clubs for use in educational purposes. If there were 3,000 mosques in Azerbaijan in 1917, in 1927 this number was 1,700, and in 1933 it was 17.

After the occupation, the mosque was closed and used as a granary.

=== After independence ===
After Azerbaijan regained its independence, the building was again used as a mosque. The mosque was included in the list of immovable historical and cultural monuments of local importance by decision No. 132 issued by the Cabinet of Ministers of the Republic of Azerbaijan on August 2, 2001.

In 2008, the mosque was restored based on the project of the "Azerbarpa" Scientific and Research Project Institute by the order of the Ministry of Culture and Tourism of Azerbaijan. The stairs, brick wall in certain places, windows, doors, window nets, wooden ceiling, roofing, attic ladder, plaster covering, ornaments, wooden floor of the vase, wooden walls and ceiling, windows, etc. had been restored. A new auxiliary building was built in the courtyard of the mosque to create conditions for worshipers.

A state-registered religious community operates in the mosque.

== Architecture ==
The foundation of the former mosque was made of river stone up to the level of the pulpit. The walls were made of a combination of river stone and shaved limestone in the lectern part, and in the rest of the places, they were made of baked bricks measuring 20 m × 20 m × 4 m (66 ft × 66 ft × 13 ft) and 27 m × 13 m × 6 m (89 ft × 43 ft × 20 ft). From the top of the walls, nine rows of brick eaves run along the edges of the pediment. The second floor for women is located above the balcony. It is possible to go up to the second floor and the attic with a staircase starting from the right corner of the northern wall. Oak beams were used in the covering construction of the roof of the mosque.

The architectural planning solution of the former mosque in the village of Rustov is little different from the "Ardebil" mosque in Guba. Comparing the mosques leads to the idea that they were built by the same masters. The only difference is that the Rustov mosque is slightly bigger than the "Ardebil" mosque. Its prayer hall is divided into four parts by three rows of columns (three columns in each row), while the prayer hall of "Ardebil" mosque is divided into three parts by two rows of columns (two columns in each row). There is a 5 m (16 ft)-high mihrab.

On the southern facade of the mosque, the epigraphic inscription located below the round window was written on the shaved limestone, which says that the mosque was first built by Haji Yusif.

== Gallery ==
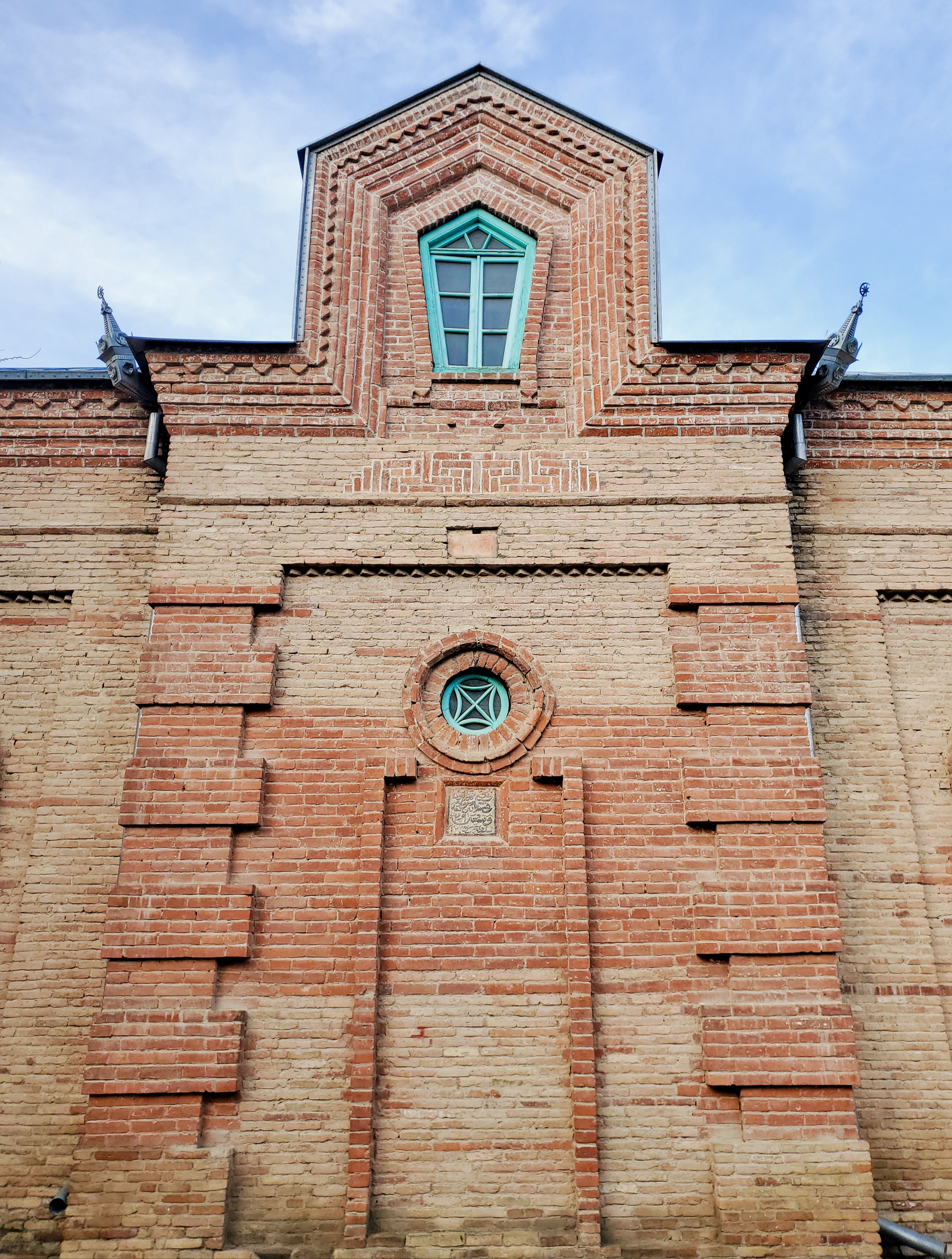

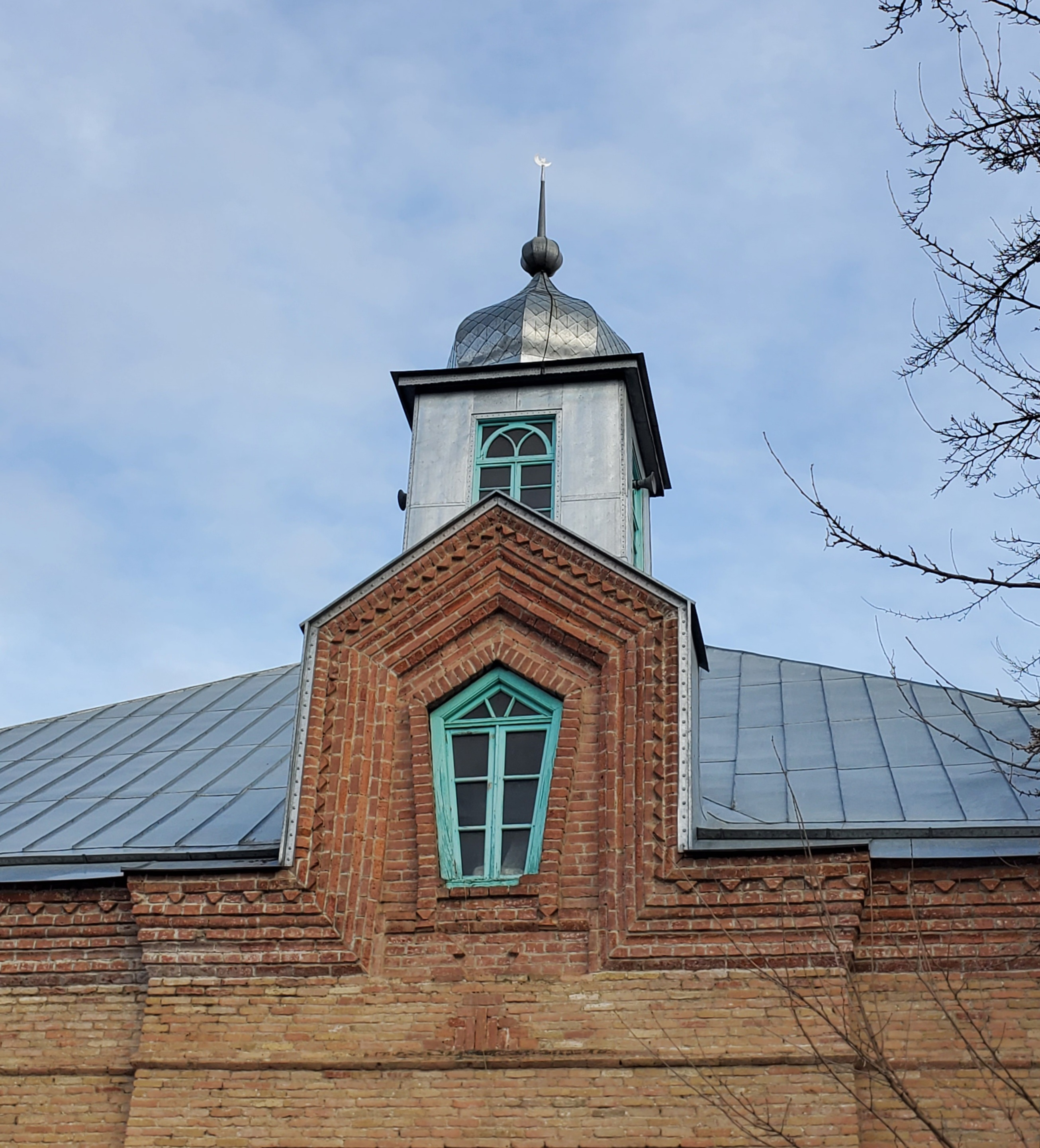

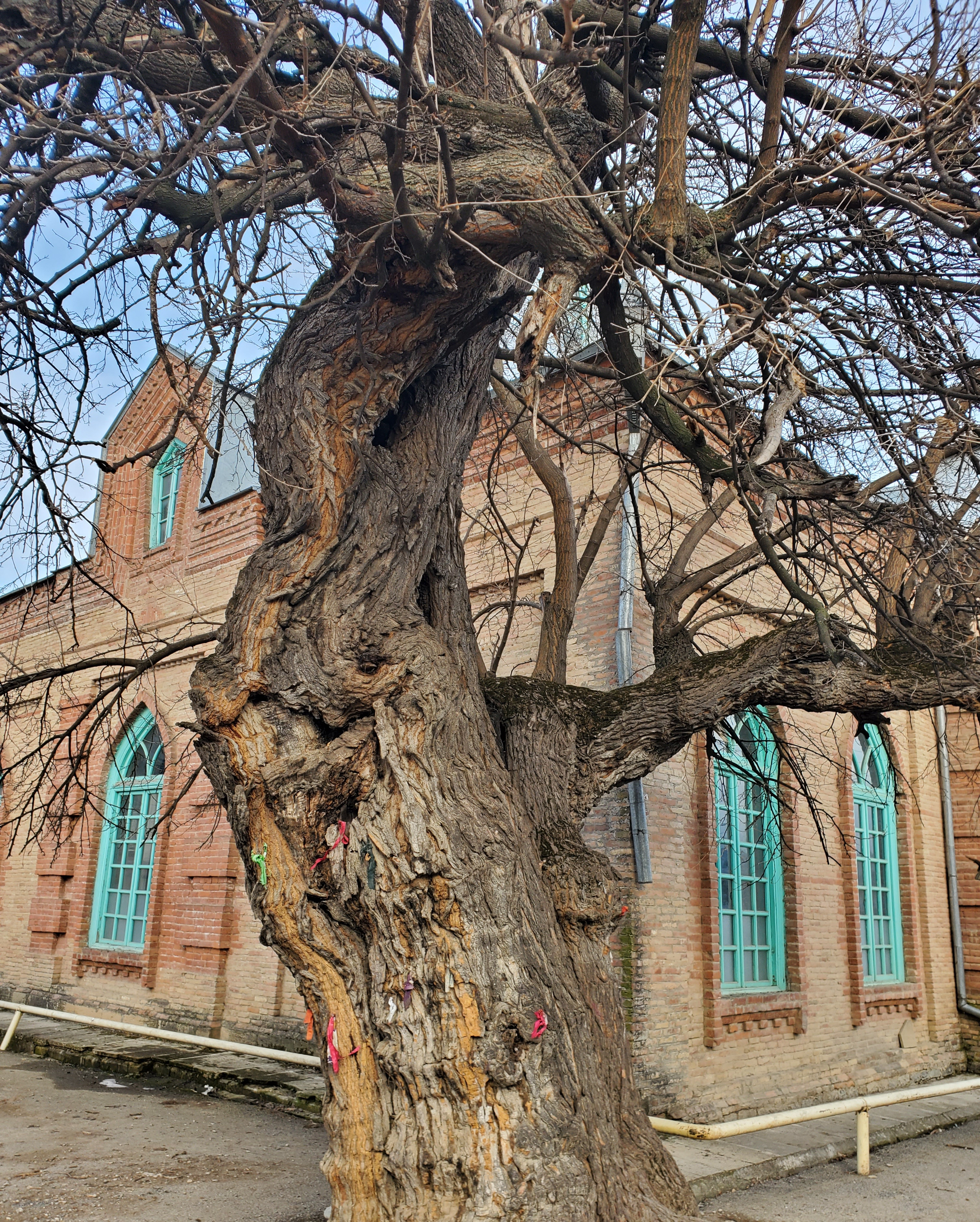

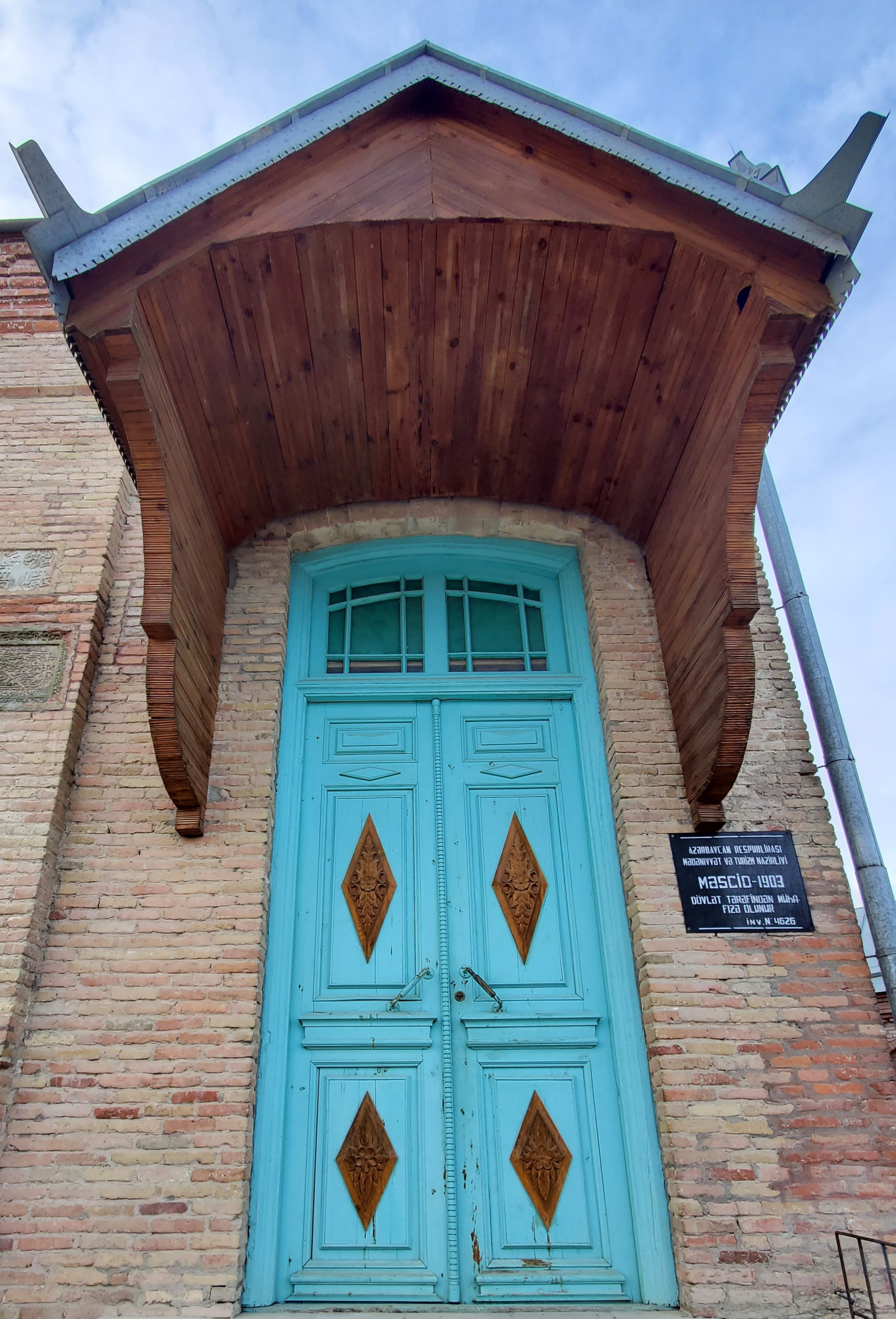

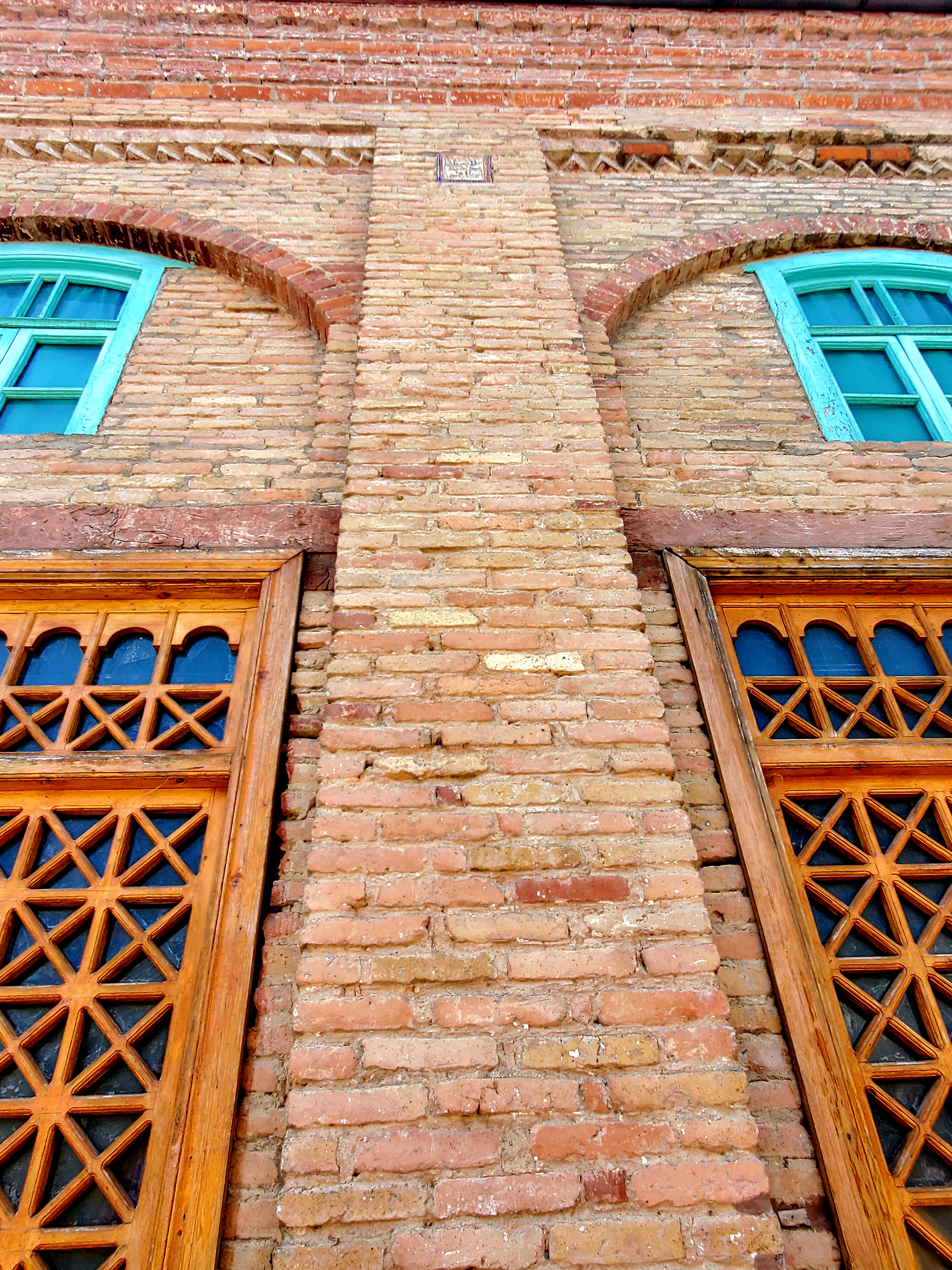

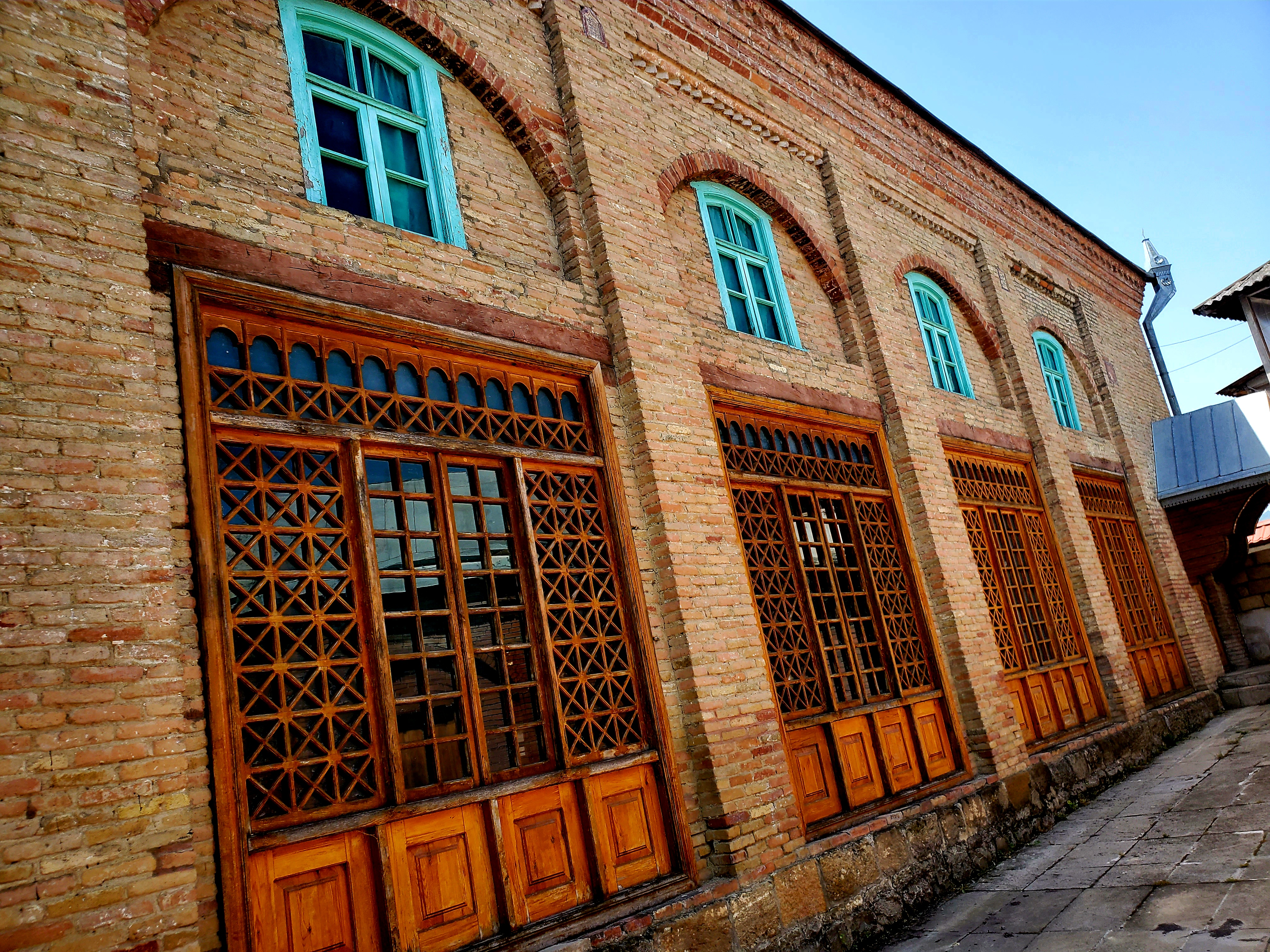

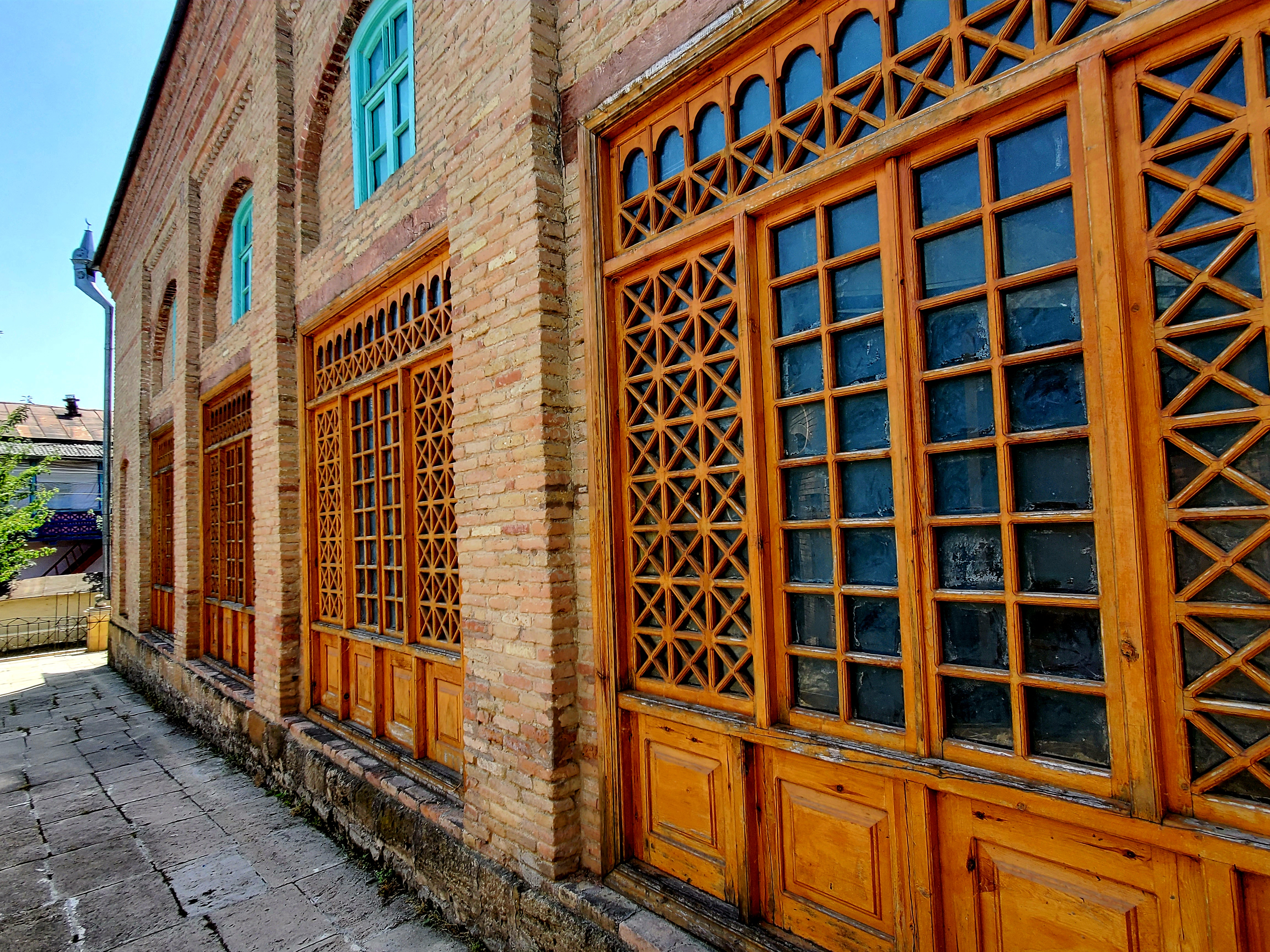

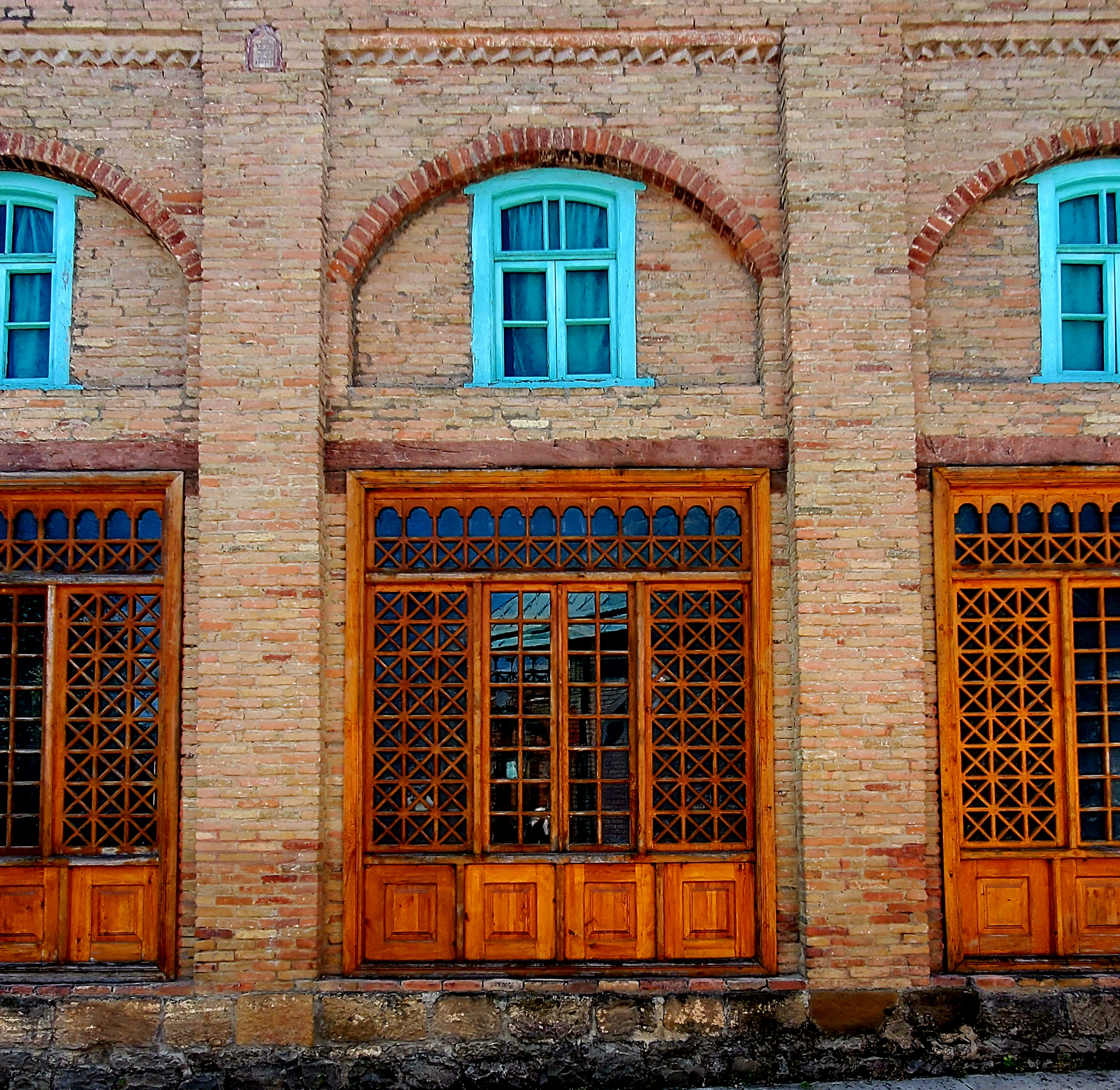

== See also ==
- Islam in Azerbaijan
- List of mosques in Azerbaijan
