= Thomas R. Cundari =

American chemist

Thomas R. Cundari is regents professor of chemistry at the University of North Texas and co-director of the Center for Advanced Scientific Computing and Modeling (CASCaM).

== Career ==
Dr. Cundari received his B.S. in 1986 from Pace University in New York City and his Ph.D. in 1990 from the University of Florida. From 1990–1991 he was a postdoctoral fellow at North Dakota State University. After serving 11 years on the faculty at the University of Memphis, Dr. Cundari joined the UNT faculty in Fall, 2002.

Dr. Cundari is one of two co-editors of Reviews in Computational Chemistry, the foremost monograph series in the field. He is on the editorial board of Journal of Molecular Structure: THEOCHEM.

Tom Cundari was chosen to participate in one of the 46 funded Energy Frontier Research Centers (EFRCs). The project is led by long-time Cundari Group collaborator, Prof. T. Brent Gunnoe (chemistry, University of Virginia). The UNT team will work with leading researchers from the University of Virginia, Yale University, Princeton University, the California Institute of Technology, University of North Carolina-Chapel Hill, the Scripps Research Institute, Brigham Young University, Colorado School of Mines, and the University of Maryland to identify novel catalysts for meeting the U.S.'s energy needs. The UNT team along with groups at BYU and Caltech will provide the lead in modeling and simulation research within this EFRC, entitled "Center for Catalytic Hydrocarbon Functionalization".
