= Bad, Azerbaijan =

Bad
- Location within Azerbaijan
- Coordinates: 41°15′N 48°34′E
- Country: Azerbaijan
- Rayon: Quba
- Municipality: Rustov

Population (2009)
  - Total: 482
- Time zone: UTC+4 (AZT)
  - Summer (DST): UTC+5 (AZT)

Bad is a village in the Quba Rayon of Azerbaijan. The village forms part of the municipality of Rustov.
