= Cadarı =

Village in Quba District, Azerbaijan

Coordinates: 41°15′N 48°37′E

Cadarı is a village in the municipality of Rustov in the Quba Rayon of Azerbaijan.
