= Yekdar =

- Location within Azerbaijan
- Coordinates: 41°14′N 48°35′E
- Country: Azerbaijan
- Rayon: Quba
- Municipality: Rustov

Population
  - Total: 9
- Time zone: UTC+4 (AZT)
  - Summer (DST): UTC+5 (AZT)

Yekdar (also, Ektor Kishlag) is a small village in the Quba Rayon of Azerbaijan. The village forms part of the municipality of Rustov and has a population of 9.
