= Gürdəh =

- Location within Azerbaijan
- Coordinates: 41°10′42″N 48°30′46″E
- Country: Azerbaijan
- Rayon: Quba
- Municipality: Zıxır
- Time zone: UTC+4 (AZT)
  - Summer (DST): UTC+5 (AZT)

Gürdəh (also, Girdaz, Gurdag, and Kyurdakh) is a village in the Quba Rayon of Azerbaijan. The village forms part of the municipality of Zıxır.
