= Sofikənd =

Sofikend
- Azerbaijani: Sofikənd
- Location within Azerbaijan
- Coordinates: 41°13′N 48°46′E
- Country: Azerbaijan
- District: Quba
- Municipality: Qamqam
- Time zone: UTC+4 (AZT)
  - Summer (DST): UTC+5 (AZT)

Sofikənd (also, Sofikend) is a village in the Quba District of Azerbaijan. The village forms part of the municipality of Qamqam.
