= Journal of Molecular Structure =

- Discipline: Chemistry
- Language: English
- Edited by: Rui Fausto

Publication details
- History: 1968-present
- Publisher: Elsevier ScienceDirect
- Frequency: biweekly
- Impact factor: 4.0 (2023)

Standard abbreviations
- ISO 4: J. Mol. Struct.

Indexing
- ISSN: 0022-2860

Links
- Journal homepage; Description page

Journal of Molecular Structure is a scientific journal published by Elsevier through ScienceDirect since 1968. It specializes in research on the structural properties of molecules, emphasizing experimental and computational studies in fields like chemistry, physics, and materials science.

The journal publishes work on a wide array of topics, including molecular spectroscopy, crystallography, and molecular modeling. It serves as a platform for advancements in structural analysis techniques, such as X-ray diffraction, nuclear magnetic resonance (NMR), and vibrational spectroscopy, contributing to a deeper understanding of molecular systems and interactions.

The journal operates under a peer-review system, ensuring the quality and significance of its published research. It offers both subscription-based and open-access publishing options, making it accessible to a broad scientific audience. Researchers value the journal for its comprehensive coverage and rigorous editorial standards.

== See also ==
- Journal of Molecular Structure: THEOCHEM
