= Janina Kneipp =

German scientist

- Education: Freie Universität Berlin
- Scientific career
- Workplaces: Humboldt-Universität zu Berlin; Princeton University; BAM Federal Institute for Materials Research and Testing; Robert Koch-Institute Berlin RKI
- Thesis: Fourier-Transform-Infrarot-mikrospektroskopische Charakterisierung transmissibler spongiformer Enzephalopathien (2002)
- Website: KneippLab

Janina Kneipp is a German scientist who is Professor of Physical Chemistry Humboldt University of Berlin. Her research considers surface enhanced Raman scattering and plasmonic enhancement in multi-modal micro spectroscopy.

== Early life and education ==
Kneipp was an undergraduate student at the Free University of Berlin, where she specialised in biology and physics. She remained in Berlin for graduate studies, where she worked on Fourier-transform infrared spectroscopy at RKI. After earning her doctorate, she moved to the Erasmus University Rotterdam, where she worked on optical spectroscopies. She was a postdoctoral researcher at Princeton University.

== Research and career ==
In 2005, Kneipp joined the BAM Federal Institute for Materials Research and Testing. She moved to the Humboldt University of Berlin in 2008. Her research develops multi-photon spectroscopy for bioanalysis. She was supported by the European Research Council to develop Multiphoton Processes Using Plasmonics. As part of her work, Kneipp developed multi-functional nanosensors, which can be combined with plasmonic nanoparticles and provide multiple surface-enhanced spectroscopic signatures. Plasmonic structures can enhance local optical fields, In particular, Kneipp is interested in Surface-enhanced Raman scattering (SERS) of complex samples. She uses SERS to better understand how molecules interact with nanostructures, for applications in biospectroscopy and in plasmonic catalysis.

Beyond SERS, Kneipp has shown that a combination of Raman spectroscopy with other methods can be used to study plant samples. Vibrational spectra of plants can provide information about the biochemical composition of structures like pollen, and can give information on plant-climate interactions.

From 2015-2020, Kneipp joined the German Research Foundation (DFG) review board for chemistry. She is member of excellence cluster UniSysCat and the Einstein Center of Catalysis. She is co-founder of the School of Analytical Sciences Adlershof (SALSA), a graduate program at HU.

== Awards and honours ==
- 2010 European Research Council Starting Grant
- 2010 Bunsen-Kirchhoff Award for Analytical Spectroscopy
- 2013 Wilhelm Ostwald Fellow
- 2018 Caroline von Humboldt Professorship

== Selected publications ==
- Janina Kneipp; Harald Kneipp; Katrin Kneipp (20 March 2008). "SERS--a single-molecule and nanoscale tool for bioanalytics". Chemical Society Reviews. 37 (5): 1052–1060. doi:10.1039/b708459p. ISSN 0306-0012. PMID 18443689. Wikidata Q37149997.
- Fani Madzharova; Zsuzsanna Heiner; Janina Kneipp (22 May 2017). "Surface enhanced hyper Raman scattering (SEHRS) and its applications". Chemical Society Reviews. 46 (13): 3980–3999. doi:10.1039/c7cs00137a. ISSN 0306-0012. PMID 28530726. Wikidata Q38680877.
- Katrin Kneipp; Harald Kneipp; Janina Kneipp (1 July 2006). "Surface-enhanced Raman scattering in local optical fields of silver and gold nanoaggregates-from single-molecule Raman spectroscopy to ultrasensitive probing in live cells". Accounts of Chemical Research. 39 (7): 443–450. doi:10.1021/ar050107x. ISSN 0001-4842. PMID 16846208. Wikidata Q36538471.
