= Qamqam =

- Municipality
- Location within Azerbaijan
- Coordinates: 41°14′52″N 48°36′11″E
- Country: Azerbaijan
- Rayon: Quba

Population
  - Total: 2,080
- Time zone: UTC+4 (AZT)
  - Summer (DST): UTC+5 (AZT)

Qamqam (also, Qam-qam, Gamgam, and Gam-Gam) is a village and municipality in the Quba Rayon of Azerbaijan. It has a population of 2,080. The municipality consists of the villages of Qamqam, Sofikənd, and Hacıağalar.
