= Cağacıq =

Human settlement in Azerbaijan

Coordinates: 41°21′N 48°44′E

Cağacıq (also, Cağacuq) is a village and municipality in the Quba Rayon of Azerbaijan. It has a population of 395.
