= Zıxır =

- Municipality
- Location within Azerbaijan
- Coordinates: 41°10′52″N 48°27′49″E
- Country: Azerbaijan
- Rayon: Quba

Population
  - Total: 462
- Time zone: UTC+4 (AZT)
  - Summer (DST): UTC+5 (AZT)

Zıxır (also, Zuxur and Zykhyr) is a village and municipality in the Quba Rayon of Azerbaijan. It has a population of 462. The municipality consists of the villages of Zıxır, Dalıqaya, and Gürdəh.
