= Qədiməlikqışlaq =

Gadmalygyshlag
- Azerbaijani: Qədmalıqışlaq
- Location within Azerbaijan
- Coordinates: 41°22′N 48°46′E
- Country: Azerbaijan
- District: Khachmaz
- Municipality: Garajik Zeyid
- Time zone: UTC+4 (AZT)
  - Summer (DST): UTC+5 (AZT)

Qədmalıqışlaq (also, Gadmalygyshlag) is a village in the Khachmaz District of Azerbaijan. The village forms part of the municipality of Garajik Zeyid.
