= Pirvahid =

- Municipality
- Location within Azerbaijan
- Coordinates: 41°19′44″N 48°40′28″E
- Country: Azerbaijan
- Rayon: Quba

Population
  - Total: 1,293
- Time zone: UTC+4 (AZT)
  - Summer (DST): UTC+5 (AZT)

Pirvahid (also, Pirvagid and Pirvaid) is a village and municipality in the Quba Rayon of Azerbaijan. It has a population of 1,293.
