= Ewa Bulska =

Polish chemist and professor

- Born: Ewa Joanna Bulska; August 2, 1953 (age 73); Warsaw, Poland
- Education: University of Warsaw
- Spouse: Tadeusz Bulski
- Website: beta.chem.uw.edu.pl/people/EBulska/kariera.html

Ewa Joanna Bulska (born August 2, 1953) is a Polish chemist, and Professor of Chemical Sciences at the University of Warsaw, who specializes in analytical chemistry, atomic and mass spectrometry with over 237 scholarly publications.

== Biography ==
Bulska completed her master's degree in 1977 and her PhD in 1986 at the University of Warsaw's Faculty of Chemistry. She obtained her habilitation in chemical sciences and spectrometry in 1996, based on her scientific dissertation (entitled "Utilization of microwave plasma in coupled systems for inorganic trace analysis"), and was promoted to Professorship of Chemical Sciences in 2004. She worked at the Faculty of Chemistry at the University of Warsaw, and at the Higher School of Ecology and Management in Warsaw.

Bulska was a fellow of the Max Planck Society, and held a post-doctoral fellowship at the Max Planck Institute in Dortmund, Germany; she was also a fellow of the Alexander von Humboldt Foundation, completing an internship at the Technical University of Darmstadt, Germany.

She was also a visiting professor at several universities in China, Japan, Germany, Slovenia, Sweden and the USA.

She was the first chairperson of the Polish Council of Metrology, operating at the President of the Central Office of Measures, which was established as a result of the amendment to the Act on Measures, signed by the President of the Republic of Poland on 6 May 2017.

She is the acting director of the Biological and Chemical Research Center at the University of Warsaw, a member of the Committee of Analytical Chemistry of the Polish Academy of Sciences (PAN), and also Chairwoman of the Spectral Analysis Team at the Committee of Analytical Chemistry of the Polish Academy of Sciences and a member of the Consultative Council of the Central Office of Measures. She is also a member of the Scientific Council of the Institute of Physical Chemistry of the Polish Academy of Sciences. Since 2022, he has been a member of the advisory team for the “Polish Metrology” program at the Ministry of Education and Science.

She is the National Delegate representing Poland in Eurachem.

== Honors ==
In 2004, Bulska was awarded the "Bunsen-Kirchhoff Award for Analytical Spectroscopy" for her work in the field of furnace atomic absorption spectrometry with special mention of the use of matrix modifiers as well as for the analysis of biological materials and for studies on the conservation of art objects. In 2012 she was awarded the Wiktor Kemula Medal. In 2015 the International Union of Pure and Applied Chemistry awarded her with IUPAC 2015 Distinguished Women in Chemistry or Chemical Engineering Award, presented at the IUPAC Congress in Busan, Korea. In 2008 she received the Gold Medal for Long Service. In 2015, she received the Gold Cross of Merit and in 2019 she was awarded the Polish state order for extraordinary and distinguished service Order of Polonia Restituta Fifth Class, the Knight's Cross. In 2022 she received an award for outstanding achievements in spectroscopy and contributions to the international spectroanalytical society from the Federal University of Pelotas in Brazil. In 2024, the Czech Spectroscopic Society and the Slovak Spectroscopic Society awarded her the Ioannes Marcus Marci Medal for outstanding achievements in trace and speciation analysis using atomic spectroscopy methods.
