= Dieter Mecke =

German biochemist and chemist (1933–2013)

- Born: 8 March 1933; Heidelberg, Baden-Württemberg, Germany
- Died: 28 May 2013 (aged 80); Tübingen, Baden-Württemberg, Germany
- Occupations: Biochemist; chemist
- Children: 3
- Parent(s): Reinhard Mecke; M. Guillery

Dieter Mecke (8 March 1933, in Heidelberg – 28 May 2013, in Tübingen) was a German biochemist and chemist.

== Life ==
Dieter Mecke was the fourth of nine children of the physicist Reinhard Mecke, after whom Mecke's symbols have been named. He studied chemistry until 1959 in Freiburg. In his biochemical doctorate he was supervised by Kurt Wallenfels. He worked for one year for Fritz Kaudewitz at the Max Planck Institute in Berlin and returned 1964 to the biochemical institute of the medical faculty, where he habilitated in 1969 in biochemistry. From 1970 to 1971 he was dean and from 1973 professor in Freiburg.

From 1974 he was professor at the Physiological-Chemical Institute in Tübingen, which is now the Interfacultary Institute for Biochemistry (IFIB). From 1980 until his retirement in 2001 he was the director of this institute. From 1987 to 1989 he was dean of the faculty of chemistry and pharmacy in Tübingen and from 1994 to 1999 prorector for research. He investigated the regulation of the metabolism and the cell cycle and focussed on molecular biological and endocrinological topics as well as enzymology and the differentiation of the parenchyma of the liver.

Additionally, he was since 2000 chairman of the supervisory board of HB Technologies AG. He was married and had three children.

== Publications ==
- Reinigung und Eigenschaften der L-Histidinolphosphat-2-Oxoglutarat-Aminotransferase (EC 2. 6. 1. 9.) aus Salmonella typhimurium. Freiburg i. B., 1963.
- Regulation der Glutaminsynthetase in Escherichia coli durch enzymkatalysierte chemische Modifizierung. Freiburg i. B., 1969.
