= Məçkə-Xacə =

Village in Quba Rayon, Azerbaijan

Məçkə-Xacə (also, Məçkə-xacə) is a village in the municipality of Rustov in the Quba Rayon of Azerbaijan.
