= Computational and Theoretical Chemistry =

- Discipline: Chemistry
- Language: English
- Edited by: C. E. Dykstra, A. J. Thakkar, M. Yáñez

Publication details
- Former name(s): Journal of Molecular Structure: THEOCHEM
- History: 1985–present
- Publisher: Elsevier
- Frequency: Biweekly
- Impact factor: 1.926 (2020)

Standard abbreviations
- ISO 4: Comput. Theor. Chem.

Indexing
- ISSN: 2210-271X
- OCLC no.: 702664165

Links
- Journal homepage; Online access

Computational and Theoretical Chemistry is a peer-reviewed scientific journal published by Elsevier. It was established in 1985 as Journal of Molecular Structure: THEOCHEM, a spin-off of the Journal of Molecular Structure. It obtained its current name in 2011 and covers molecular structure in theoretical chemistry.

== Abstracting, indexing, and impact factor ==
According to the Journal Citation Reports, the journal had a 2020 impact factor of 1.926.

It is indexed in the following bibliographic databases:

- Chemical Abstracts
- ScienceDirect
- Inspec
- Scopus
- Web of Science
- Current Contents - Physical, Chemical & Earth Sciences
