= Xanəgah, Quba =

Xanəgah
- Municipality
- Location within Azerbaijan
- Coordinates: 41°13′11″N 48°32′47″E
- Country: Azerbaijan
- Rayon: Quba

Population
  - Total: 606
- Time zone: UTC+4 (AZT)
  - Summer (DST): UTC+5 (AZT)

Xanəgah (also, Xanagah, Xanagəh, Khanagya, and Khanagyakh) is a village and municipality in the Quba Rayon of Azerbaijan. It has a population of 606.
