= Rustov =

- Municipality
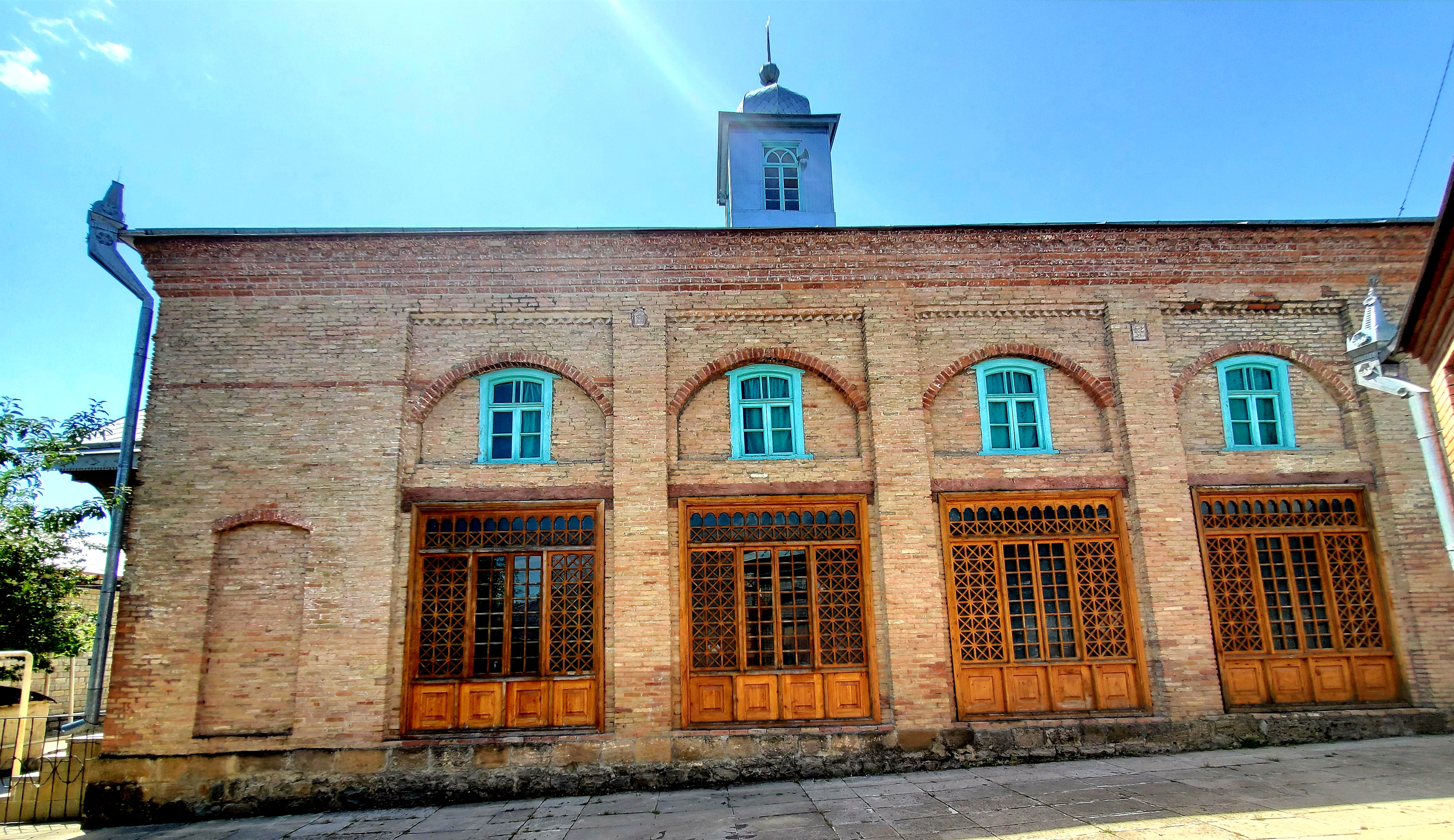

- Location within Azerbaijan
- Coordinates: 41°15′03″N 48°34′50″E
- Country: Azerbaijan
- Rayon: Quba District

Population
  - Total: 3,956
- Time zone: UTC+4 (AZT)

Rustov is a village and municipality in the Quba District of Azerbaijan. It has a population of 3,956. The municipality consists of the villages of Rustov, Pusteqasim, Kələbaq, Yekdar, Bad, Məçkə-Xacə, Cadarı, and Cındar.

== Famous people ==
- Bashir Safaroglu (1925–1969) — was an Azerbaijani Soviet theater and film actor. He was part of the Azerbaijan Musical Comedy Theater, People's Artist of Azerbaijan SSR (1968). He was the father of People's Artist of Azerbaijan Afag Bashirgyzy.

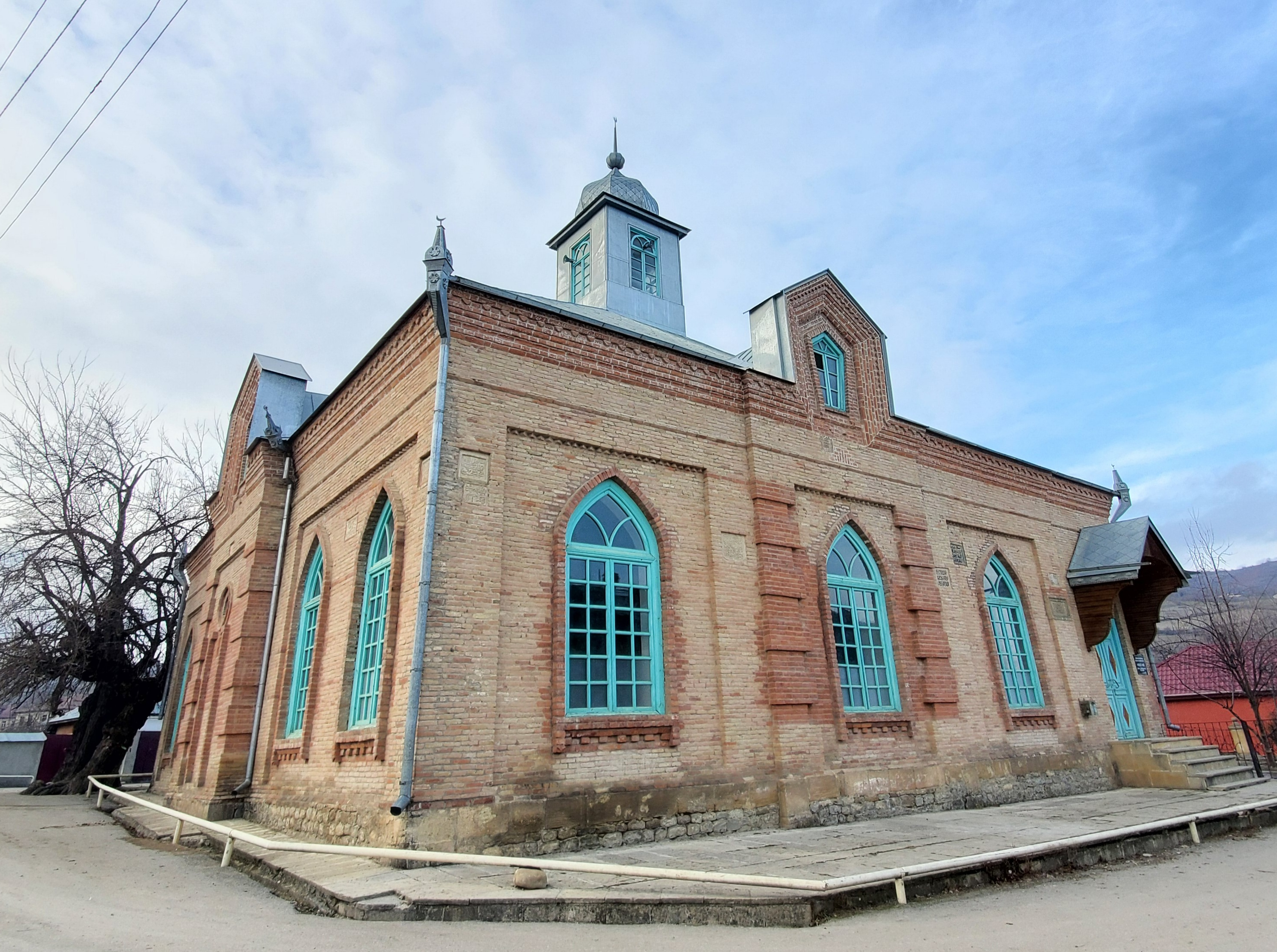
Rustov mosque
