= Reinhard Mecke =

German physicist (1895–1969)

- Born: 14 July 1895; Stettin
- Died: 30 December 1969 (aged 74)
- Education: Freiburg; University of Bern; University of Marburg
- Occupation: Physicist
- Spouse: M. Guillery (m. 1927)
- Children: 9, including Dieter

Reinhard Mecke (born 14 July 1895 in Stettin; died 30 December 1969) was a German physicist, who focused on chemical physics. He was one of the pioneers of infrared spectroscopy.

Reinhard Mecke studied from 1913 mathematics and physics at the universities of Freiburg, Bern and Marburg and did his doctorate at Franz Richarz in Marburg in 1920 on halos in homogeneous nebulas. He then worked for Heinrich Konen at the university of Bonn, where he habilitated in 1923 on spectral bands of jod and where he became a privatdozent. 1927 he married one of his PhD students M. Guillery and had with her nine children including Dieter Mecke.

1932 he became extraordinary professor for chemical physics at the University of Heidelberg, as proposed by Max Trautz. He investigated spectral bands of evaporated water and infrared and Raman spectroscopy of small organic molecules. He proved the existence of the spin onto rotary oscillation spectra of molecules. 1937 he became professor for theoretical physics at the university of Freiburg and investigated there hydrogen bonds by infrared spectroscopy. 1942 he became ordinary professor and director of the Institute for Physical Chemistry. Additionally, he was in 1958 the founder and until 1968 the director of the Institute for electric materials (Institut für Elektrowerkstoffe) of the Fraunhofer-Gesellschaft and the head of the Institute for Physical Chemistry. 1963 he retired in Freiburg.

1964 he became member of the Leopoldina. 1965 he received the Bunsen medal. He was co-author of the Handbuch der Physik by Geiger and Scheel. His article Vorlesungstechnik with Anton Lambertz of the first volume was also published as a book. He was one of the organisers of the Conferences of nobel laureates in Lindau.

== Literature ==
- W. Lüttke; G. A. A. Nonnenmacher (1995), "Reinhard Mecke (1895 – 1969): Scientific work and personality", Nachruf, Journal of Molecular Structure (in German), vol. 347, pp. 1–17, Bibcode:1995JMoSt.347....1L, doi:10.1016/0022-2860(95)08532-Z
- W. A. P. Luck (1970), "Reinhard Mecke 14.7.1895 30.12.1969", Nachruf, Physikalische Blätter (in German), vol. 26, no. 2, p. 84, doi:10.1002/phbl.19700260207
