= Dennis Sanchez =

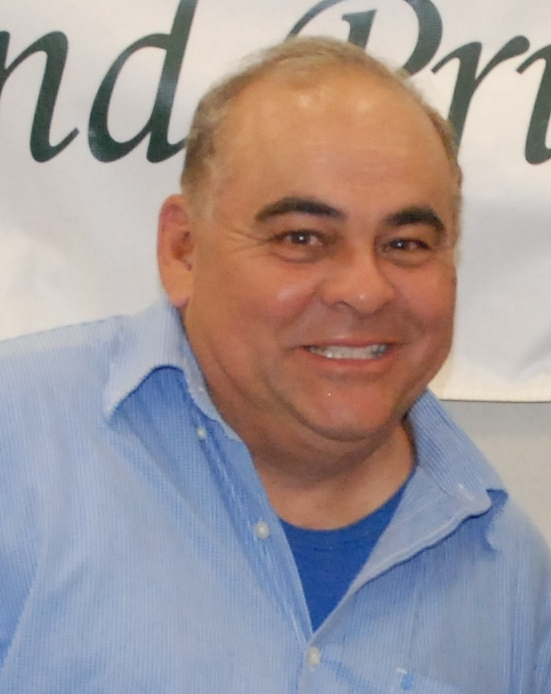
- Founder of East Side Spirit and Pride, Dennis Sanchez with co-author Nancy Ramirez (right)
- Citizenship: United States
- Education: University of Southern California, San Francisco State University
- Occupation: Professor
- Writing career
- Language: English, Spanish
- Genres: English Grammar; Literature analysis
- Notable works: Grammar Perfect, Reflections from a Looking Glass, Literature Made Easy

Dennis R. Sanchez was born in 1956 in Los Angeles. A graduate of the University of Southern California and San Francisco State University, he is a critically acclaimed author. In addition, he is a professor of English at East Los Angeles College and founded the organization, East Side Spirit and Pride, and serves as its current advisor. He was born and raised in East Los Angeles and now resides in Woodland Hills.

== Bridge To College and Fundraising Events ==
Dennis Sanchez is also closely connected with Father Greg Boyle and is a sponsor and long-time supporter of Father Boyle's non-profit organization, Homeboy Industries in Downtown Los Angeles. Professor Sanchez is currently in charge of operating a program at Homeboy Industries called Bridge to College, where he hopes to make it feasible for the homeboys to attend community colleges in the local vicinity such as East Los Angeles College in order to receive a preliminary education. In order to achieve this objective, he in conjunction with East Side Spirit and Pride has organized several fundraising events to raise sufficient funds. On March 29, 2012, East Side Spirit and Pride hosted a special dinner at Steven's Steakhouse in Commerce, California, where local celebrities such as Chase Masterson, actress in film Yesterday Was a Lie and author Luis J. Rodriguez, author of Always Running spoke. Other honorees include L.A. mayor Antonio Villaraigosa, Hilda Solis, Father Greg Boyle and Sheriff Lee Baca. All the profits made by this event proceed directly to the establishing of grants and scholarships for selected individuals from Homeboy Industries and East Side Spirit and Pride.

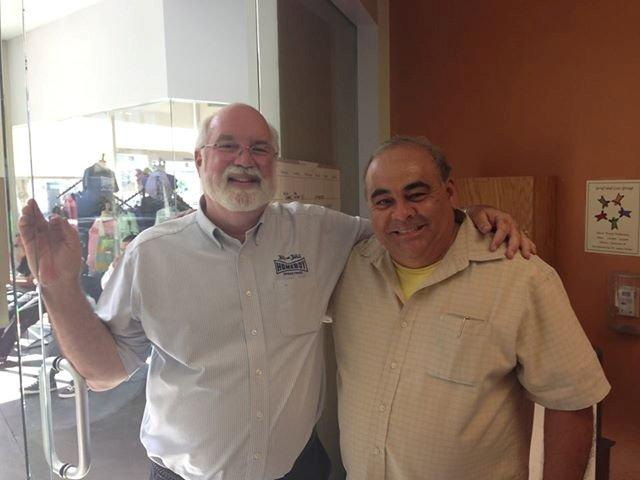
Dennis Sanchez with Father Greg Boyle, founder of Homeboy Industries

In March 2015, Santa Monica Chief of Police Jacqueline Seabrooks will receive recognition at the East Side Spirit and Pride annual fundraising dinner, as well as Father Greg Boyle.

In addition, Professor Sanchez is responsible for the incorporation of renowned Michigan born artist Kent Twitchell into the East Side Spirit and Pride Club.

== East Side Spirit and Pride ==
Dennis Sanchez founded the East Side Spirit and Pride Club in 1995 because he realized that students at East Los Angeles College are determined and motivated to succeed, though often because of external pressure and circumstantial adversity, they are not always able to satisfy their desire for self-actualization. He has often said that ELAC students must overcome more than other college students just to come to class. The club boasts of many accomplishments, including being one of the largest clubs in the college, with five divisions, dozens of faculty and staff members, and hundreds of students. The club has also made invaluable contributions to the school and surrounding community. Under his leadership, the East Side Spirit and Pride Club successfully established a marching band in the college. Sanchez was featured on KNBC as Unsung Hero in 2000 for his efforts to bring pride to a college that was in desperate need of it and his efforts to start a marching band at the college; and as a result Beverly Hills businessman Frank Fenton donated money for band uniforms. In addition to founding the ELAC Marching Band, Sanchez was responsible for the restoration of the collegiate football team in 1993. Today he is working to keep football as an active aspect of the core curriculum at the college despite severe budget cuts to the college. Today these two facets in ELAC are active and play an integral role in the social and academic atmosphere of the college. In addition, Sanchez holds a black belt in Tang Soo Doo (Chinese Open Hand) karate.

== Notable works ==
As an author, Professor Sanchez has published six books, which are currently widely used.

- Grammar Perfect: 19 Steps, 1999
- Reflections from a Looking Glass, 2000
- Grammar Perfect: a Brief Handbook, 2001
- Grammar Perfect Workbook, 2002
- Literature Made Easy, 2004
- Bridge to Success, 2013

With fellow professor Nancy Ramirez, Sanchez has published a developmental Bridge to Success with essays written specifically for the unrepresented student. The book features the art work of Fabian Debora, whose art relates the story of many underrepresented people.
