= Homeboy =

Homeboy(s), Home Boy, or Homeboyz may refer to:

== Film and television ==
- Homeboy (TV show), a Philippine TV talk show
- Homeboy (film), a 1988 film starring Mickey Rourke
- Homeboys of Oz, a fictional gang in the TV series Oz
- Sold (TV series), a British television series, produced under the working title Homeboys

== Literature ==
- Homeboyz (novel), a novel by Alan Lawrence Sitomer
- Home Boy, a novel by H. M. Naqvi
- Homeboy, a novel by Seth Morgan

== Music ==
- "Homeboy" (song), a song by Eric Church
- Homeboys (album), an album by band Adam Again
- "Homeboy", a song by Adorable
- "Homeboy", a song by JoJo from her self-titled album JoJo
- Home Boy, a 1985 album by trumpeter Don Cherry
- "Homeboyz", a song on the album "Tupac: Resurrection"
- Homeboy Sandman, American rapper

== Sports ==
- Homeboyz RFC, a Kenyan Rugby Union club based in Nairobi, Kenya
- Kakamega Homeboyz F.C., a Kenyan Rugby Union club based in Kakamega, Kenya

== Other uses ==
- Homeboy Industries, a youth program to assist gang members
- Homeboyz Interactive, an American non-profit organization

== See also ==
- Homie (disambiguation)
