= East Side Spirit and Pride =

Eastside Spirit and Pride (ESSP) is a club at East Los Angeles College, founded by Dennis Sanchez.

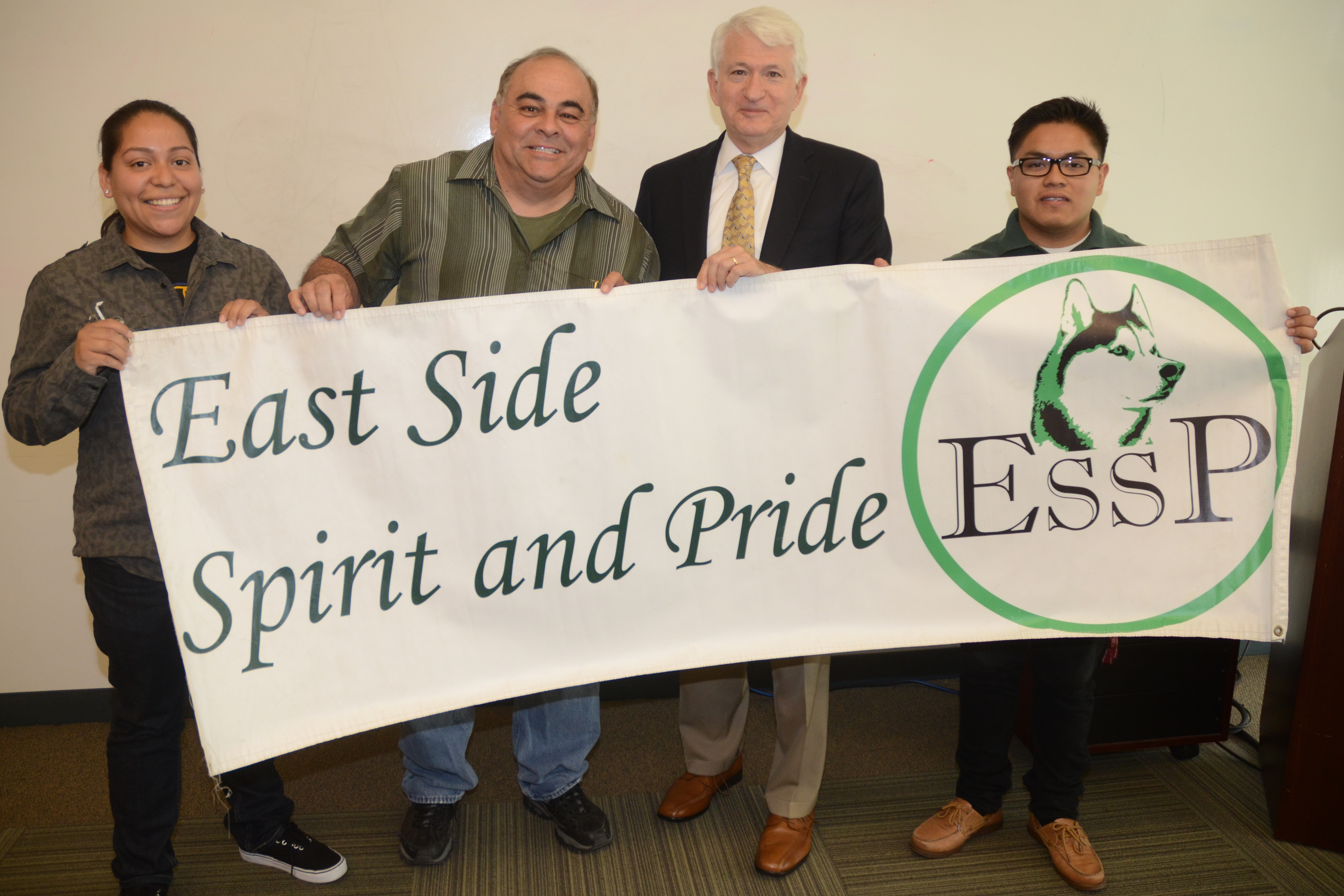
The East Side Spirit and Pride Club of East Los Angeles College with Chancellor of UCLA, Gene Block

== Mission of the Organization ==
The mission of ESSP is to assist students of East Los Angeles College to successfully transfer to four-year universities. ESSP raises funds for student scholarships and seeks to instill self-esteem in students who have had to overcome great obstacles to attend college.

== History of the ESSP ==
Professor Dennis Sanchez, an English professor at East Los Angeles College (ELAC) and alumnus of the University of Southern California and San Francisco State University, established East Side Spirit and Pride (ESSP) to help ELAC students develop pride in their community and heritage. ESSP advocated for the restoration of ELAC's football team after it had been eliminated due to budgetary constraints, and collaborated with the President of the college, Ernest Moreno, to create a marching band, ELAC was one of only three colleges in the state of California with a marching band during the time. Parents and players from West Hills Baseball, CA helped raise funds for ELAC students at an ESSP scholarship dinner and golf tournament. On March 15, 2014, ESSP sponsored a fundraising event featuring actor Edward James Olmos, alumni of East Los Angeles College and Academy Award nominee for his role in Stand and Deliver.

== ESSP Today ==
East Side Spirit and Pride (ESSP) has over 50 members, a 19-person board of directors, an associate board, a faculty/staff committee and chapters of trustees throughout Southern California. UCLA graduate and English professor Nancy Ramirez co-sponsors ESSP.

ESSP regularly features motivational speakers, generally former ELAC students who have now graduated from four year universities. ELAC speakers are also sometimes local celebrities, including Chase Masterson, actress, Luis J. Rodriguez, a Mexican-American native of East Los Angeles and author of the book Always Running: La Vida Loca, Gang Days in L.A., and congresswoman Judy Chu. The club hosts tours to various neighboring universities, such as Cal State Dominguez Hills, Cal State Fullerton, Cal State Los Angeles, UCLA, USC, Occidental and Loyola Marymount University, and has weekly readings, called Great Moments in Literature, where professors and students read and discuss literary works by authors such as Robert Frost, Ernest Hemingway, Emily Dickinson, William Shakespeare, and E. A. Robinson. The club also hosts discussions on procedures and advice for transferring to four-year universities in California, primarily the UCs, CSUs, and private universities such as USC. .

== Partnership with Homeboy Industries ==
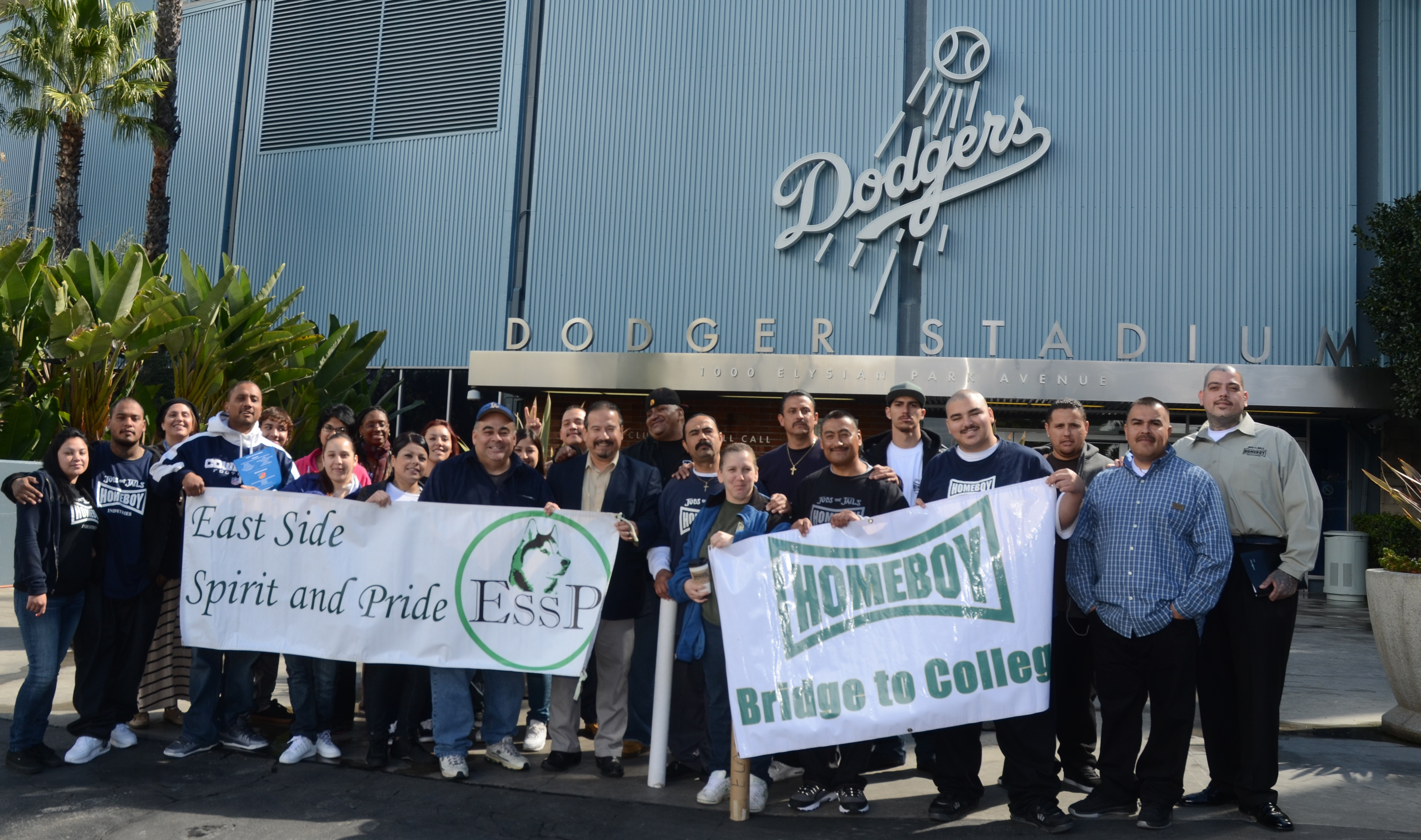
The East Side Spirit and Pride Organization together with representatives of Homeboy Industries outside of the Los Angeles Dodger Stadium

In 2010, East Side Spirit and Pride collaborated with Father Greg Boyle and Homeboy Industries to reach out to the surrounding community. ESSP members tutor members of Homeboy Industries. Professor Dennis Sanchez teaches a class called "Bridge to College" at Homeboy Industries, and takes Homeboy Industries members on tours to ELAC and other colleges in the Los Angeles area. Many students from Homeboy Industries have since enrolled at Los Angeles community colleges. Proceeds from the ESSP Annual Scholarship Dinner and its lunch and golf tournament fund educational scholarships and grants for members of Homeboy Industries and other at-risk members of the community.

== Extensions and Divisions of ESSP ==
- Tuesday ESSP
- East Side Spirit and Pride Teacher's Committee
- Committee of East Side Spirit and Pride's Annual Dinner
- East Side Spirit and Pride Board of Directors
- East Side Spirit and Pride Board of Trustees
