= Homey =

Homey may refer to:

- Homey (album), album by the American band Chon
- Homey (smart hub), device manufactured by the Dutch company Athom
- Homey Airport, US military facility more commonly known as Area 51
- Homey D. Clown, character from In Living Color

== See also ==
- Homi (disambiguation)
- Homie (disambiguation)
