= Homie =

Homie may refer to:

- Homie (band), a project of Rivers Cuomo
- Homies (musical group), South Korean hip hop group
- Homies (toy), a series of small toy figurines
- "Homies" (Insane Clown Posse song), 2002
- "Homies" (A Lighter Shade of Brown song), 1992
- Homie (rapper), Belarusian singer, songwriter, rap and hip-hop artist
- Homie, a nickname for the character Homer Simpson

== See also ==
- Homeboy (disambiguation)
- Homey (disambiguation)
- "Homegirl", a song by King Princess from the album Cheap Queen
- Homer Simpson, a character in The Simpsons
