= 1949 East Los Angeles Huskies football team =

American college football season

1949 East Los Angeles Huskies football

Metropolitan champion
- Conference: Metropolitan Conference
- Record: 10–0 (4–0 Metropolitan)
- Head coach: Al Hunt (4th season)

1949 Metropolitan Conference football standings
	Conf.					Overall
Team	W		L		T	W		L		T
East Los Angeles $	4	–	0	–	0	10	–	0	–	0
San Diego Junior College	3	–	1	–	0	8	–	2	–	0
El Camino	2	–	2	–	0	7	–	3	–	0
Bakersfield	1	–	3	–	0	3	–	6	–	1
Santa Monica	0	–	4	–	0	3	–	6	–	0
$ – Conference champion

The 1949 East Los Angeles Huskies football team was an American football team that represented East Los Angeles Junior College as a member of the Metropolitan Conference during the 1949 junior college football season. Led by fourth-year head coach Al Hunt, the Huskies compiled a perfect 10–0 record, won the Metropolitan Conference championship, and outscored opponents by a total of 253 to 110.

Despite being the only undefeated and untied football team in Southern California, and being ranked No. 5 in the Williamson ratings for small colleges, the Huskies finished second in the voting to represent the west in the Junior Rose Bowl and declined an invitation to play in the Gold Dust Bowl. One official stated, "East Los Angeles retires from the Metropolitan Conference football season undefeated, untied, unwanted and uninvited."

East Los Angeles freshman end Bill Hattig was selected as a first-team players on the 1949 All-Southern California junior college football team. Three East Los Angeles players were named to the second team: backs Ed Sherrill and Jimmy Dyer and center Nick Sadd.

Four East Los Angeles players were selected as first-team players on the 1949 All-Metropolitan Conference football team: quarterback Bob Sherrill; end Bill Hattig; center Nick Sadd; and back Skippy Dyer. End Bob Hughes and guard Penington were named to the second team. Sadd received the honor for the second consecutive year.

== Schedule ==
Date	Opponent	Site	Result	Attendance	Source
September 16	at Glendale (CA)*	Glendale High School; Glendale, CA	W 19–12		
September 23	at Chaffey*	Ontario, CA	W 27–19		
September 29	at San Bernardino*	Orange Show Stadium; San Bernardino, CA	W 24–7	6,000	
October 7	vs. Los Angeles City*	Patterson Field; Los Angeles, CA	W 19–14		
October 14	at Santa Monica	Santa Monica, CA	W 26–7		
October 22	at Oceanside-Carlsbad*	Oceanside, CA	W 19–7		
November 4	vs. City College of San Francisco*	Downey High School; Downey, CA	W 53–6		
November 11	at Bakersfield	Griffith Stadium; Bakersfield, CA	W 33–18		
November 17	at San Diego Junior College	San Diego, CA	W 27–20		
November 25	at El Camino	El Camino Football Stadium; Torrance, CA	W 6–0	8,500	
*Non-conference game
