= ESSP =

ESSP may refer to:

- Earth System Science Partnership, a partnership under the auspices of the ICSU for the integrated study of the Earth system
- East Side Spirit and Pride, a club in East Los Angeles College
- Norrköping Airport (ICAO code: ESSP), an airport situated around three km from the city center of Norrköping, Sweden
