= Al Hunt (American football) =

American football player and coach

Playing career
- 1931–1932: Occidental
- Position: Center

Coaching career (HC unless noted)
- 1945: San Fernando HS (CA)
- 1946–1950: East Los Angeles
- 1951: Los Angeles Valley (backfield)
- 1952–1961: Los Angeles Valley

Head coaching record
- Bowls: 1–0 (junior college)

Accomplishments and honors

Championships
- 2 Metropolitan Conference (1959–1955)

Alfred "Ace" Hunt was an American football coach. He served as the head football coach at East Los Angeles College Junior College—now known as East Los Angeles College—from 1946 to 1950 and Los Angeles Valley College from 1952 to 1961.

Hunt attended Van Nuys High School and played college football at Occidental College in Los Angeles. He was the football coach at San Fernando High School in Los Angeles in 1945. He was hired as the backfield coach for the football team at Los Angeles Valley in 1951.

== Head coaching record ==
=== Junior college ===
Year	Team	Overall	Conference	Standing	Bowl/playoffs
East Los Angeles Huskies () (1946)
1946	East Los Angeles				
East Los Angeles Huskies (Metropolitan Conference) (1947–1950)
1947	East Los Angeles	3–6	1–3	5th	
1948	East Los Angeles	5–5	3–1	2nd	
1949	East Los Angeles	10–0	4–0	1st	
1950	East Los Angeles	8–2	5–2	2nd	
East Los Angeles:					
Los Angeles Valley Monarchs (Metropolitan Conference) (1952–1961)
1952	Los Angeles Valley	8–1–1	5–1–1	T–2nd	
1953	Los Angeles Valley	6–4	5–2	2nd	
1954	Los Angeles Valley	4–6	2–5	T–5th	
1955	Los Angeles Valley	9–1	6–1	1st	W Orange Show Bowl
1956	Los Angeles Valley	6–2–1	4–2–1	T–2nd	
1957	Los Angeles Valley	2–7	2–5	T–6th	
1958	Los Angeles Valley	4–5	3–4	5th	
1959	Los Angeles Valley	4–5	4–3	T–3rd	
1960	Los Angeles Valley	1–8	1–6	7th	
1961	Los Angeles Valley	0–9	0–7	8th	
Los Angeles Valley:		41–48–2	32–36–2		
Total:					
National championship Conference title Conference division title or championship game berth
