= David Scott Lawrence =

American chemical biologist

- Education: East Los Angeles College (AA) University of California at Irvine (BS - Biological Science) University of California at Los Angeles (PhD - Chemistry)
- Scientific career
- Fields: Chemical Biology
- Doctoral advisor: Robert V. Stevens
- Other academic advisors: Harold W. Moore, E. Thomas Kaiser

David Scott Lawrence is the Fred Eshelman Distinguished Professor at the University of North Carolina at Chapel Hill. He is known for his work in chemical biology, developing strategies for the design of self-assembling molecular systems, methods for detecting and manipulating protein kinase activity, and the construction of light-responsive proteins and drug delivery systems.

== Education ==
Lawrence received his Bachelor of Science degree in the biological sciences from the University of California at Irvine. He earned his Doctor of Philosophy in chemistry from the University of California at Los Angeles in 1982, where he pursued the total synthesis of steroids and Vitamin D analogs.

== Career ==
Lawrence was a National Institutes of Health postdoctoral fellow at the Rockefeller University in New York City. He subsequently served as a professor in the Department of Chemistry at the State University of New York at Buffalo for 10 years. He joined the Department of Biochemistry at the Albert Einstein College of Medicine in 1996, and then moved to the University of North Carolina at Chapel Hill in 2007 as the Fred Eshelman Distinguished Professor. He was elected a fellow of the American Association for the Advancement of Science in 2005. He holds affiliated appointments across multiple schools at the University of North Carolina and chaired the Division of Chemical Biology and Medicinal Chemistry in the UNC Eshelman School of Pharmacy from 2011 to 2025.

== Research ==
Lawrence's research in chemical biology explores the design of molecules that emulate or control biological processes. His work intersects the areas of supramolecular chemistry, cellular signaling, and targeted drug delivery. In the area of supramolecular chemistry, he created "self-assembling molecules by selecting component molecules whose parts carry different electric charges or are either attracted to or repelled by water...the molecules snap together automatically, like a self-assembling jigsaw puzzle." The assembled multicomponent entities mimic the oxygen carrying protein hemoglobin and the cytochrome P-450 family of proteins.

Lawrence also developed molecules programmed to target protein kinases, signaling enzymes that, if mutated, can promote various cancers, as well as neurological, autoimmune, and cardiovascular diseases. Light-activated analogs of these protein kinase targeting molecules were designed as well, in order to "turn [signaling] pathways on and off non-invasively”. A collaborative research program with Zhong-Yin Zhang generated bidentate inhibitors for another family of signaling enzymes, protein tyrosine phosphatases, thereby furnishing "opportunities for drug discovery against diseases such as diabetes, cancer, autoimmune diseases, and tuberculosis". Lawrence's lab also created a technology for delivering drugs to diseased sites using laser light. This therapeutic platform has been licensed by Covalt Bio, a biotechnology company.

== Pedagogy ==
Lawrence developed a laboratory safety course built around case studies in response to the spate of deaths and serious injuries in academic research laboratories. The course was subsequently transformed into an online American Chemical Society training exercise. In addition, Lawrence created "virtual laboratory experiences...emphasizing laboratory safety and bridging the gap between theoretical knowledge and practical application".
