= Advance for Medical Laboratory Professionals =

US newspaper

- Type: Business magazine
- Format: Paper and online magazine
- Owner: Merion Matters
- Editor: Matthew T. Patton
- Founded: 1991
- Language: English
- Headquarters: King of Prussia, Pennsylvania, United States
- Price: Free
- ISSN: 1088-5676
- Website: Advance for Laboratory

The biweekly trade journal Advance for Medical Laboratory Professionals started in 1991. During its time in circulation, it served an audience of bench technologists, chief technologists, cytotechnologists, generalists, histotechnologists, laboratory directors/managers, laboratory section heads, medical laboratory scientists, medical laboratory technicians, blood specialists, educators and others in the medical laboratory field. Special issues of the trade journal included the education issue, National Medical Laboratory Professionals Week issue, industry outlook issue, new graduate issue and the annual safety issue.

The publication also conducted a biannual salary survey of laboratory professionals in conjunction with Advance for Administrators of the Laboratory. The National Credentialing Agency for Laboratory Personnel Inc. had an editorial agreement with Advance for Medical Laboratory Professionals and the publication featured a regular column called “Ask NCA.” According to BPA Worldwide, Advance for Medical Laboratory Professionals had a circulation of 41,875 prior to ceasing publication.

== Awards ==
Advance for Medical Laboratory Professionals received the Corporate Recognition Award from the Pennsylvania chapter of the American Society for Clinical Laboratory Science. In 2006, the trade journal's editor, Matthew Patton, won an award in the Awards for Publication Excellence in the Editorial and Advocacy Writing category
