= Dolores Mission, Los Angeles =

Catholic parish in California, US

Coordinates: 34°2′43.98″N 118°13′24.54″W

- Established: 1925; 101 years ago
- Type: Hispanic ministries
- Location(s): 171 South Gless St. Los Angeles, California
- Pastor: Brendan Busse, S.J.
- Affiliations: Jesuit, Catholic
- Website: www.dolores-mission.org

Dolores Mission, Los Angeles is a Catholic parish in the largely Hispanic area of Boyle Heights in East Los Angeles. The parish has collaborated in various grassroots initiatives to combat adverse social conditions in the area, including Homeboy Industries, Proyecto Pastoral at Dolores Mission, CHIRLA, and the East Los Angeles Housing Coalition.

== History ==
The church began as a mission in St. Mary's parish in 1925 and in 1945 moved to its present site, renamed “The Mission of Nuestra Senora de los Dolores". In 1946, the Canonnesses of St. Augustine (later named the Missionary Sisters of the Immaculate Heart of Mary) came from Belgium to open the first Catholic school in the neighborhood in 1952. After 1980, the Belgians were no longer able to staff Dolores Mission and the Jesuits, at the invitation of Cardinal Manning, came to this parish. The Jesuits took as their goal to empower parishioners to exercise leadership and to build community. Since then various grassroots organizations have sprouted and grown in the parish.

From 1986 to 1992, its pastor was Greg Boyle, who is also the founder of Homeboy Industries.

== Projects ==
The "Projects" were founded after 1986 when the California Province of Jesuits was entrusted with the parish. Under community leadership, five organizations were formed providing training, education, and social services in the Pico-Aliso/Boyle Heights district of East Los Angeles.

- IMPACTO (Imaginando Mañana Pico-Aliso Community Team Outreach) is a safe, after-school facility. It offers education to nearly 200 youth grades 2-12. A community garden is a part of its after-school programming.
- Comunidad en Movimiento (Community in Action, CEM) brings community leaders together to resolve pressing issues.
- Early Childhood Education Centers Two learning centers with 16 certified teachers for over 100 children, toddlers to age 5
- Guadalupe Homeless Project Since 1988 has two shelters offering up to 90 days room and board mainly for new immigrant men. In 2015 GHP opened a women's shelter which serves annually 60 homeless women.

== See also ==
- List of Jesuit sites
