= Homi =

Homi may refer to:

== Places ==
- Homi Station, Japan
- Homi Villa, also known as Airport Core Programme Exhibition Centre

== Other ==
- Homi (tool), Korean hand plow
