= Alan Lawrence Sitomer =

American novelist

- Born: 1967 (age 58–59)
- Education: University of Southern California (BA); San Diego State University; National University
- Occupations: Novelist; educator; national speaker on literacy
- Writing career
- Notable works: Homeboyz, The Hoopster, Hip Hop High School, The Secret Story of Sonia Rodriguez, Hip-Hop Poetry and the Classics, Nerd Girls, The Downside of Being Up
- Website: www.alanlawrencesitomer.com

Alan Lawrence Sitomer (born 1967) is California's Teacher of the Year (2007) and an author of young adult fiction, teacher methodology texts, and children's literature. He has written several widely held books and has become nationally renowned for his successful work in secondary literacy instruction, particularly when it comes to engaging reluctant readers.

== Biography ==
Born in New York on February 15, 1967, Sitomer earned a B.A. degree from the University of Southern California, a teaching certificate from San Diego State University, and a master's degree from National University (California). He has taught English, Creative Writing, Speech & Debate and AVID classes at Lynwood High School in Lynwood, Los Angeles County, California and was named California's 2007 teacher of the year by the California Department of Education.

Sitomer has spoken about using feedback from kids in developing his books and has described personal experiences and observations as sources of ideas for his writing.

In addition to his teaching career, Sitomer is a speaker specializing in engaging reluctant readers. He received the 2004 award for Classroom Excellence from the Southern California Teachers of English and the 2003 Teacher of the Year honor from California Literacy. In April 2007, he was named Educator of the Year by Loyola Marymount University and in February 2008 the Insight Education Group named Alan Lawrence Sitomer the Innovative Educator of the Year.

Sitomer has also authored multiple young adult novels published by Disney and Penguin Putnam which include The Hoopster, Hip-Hop High School, Homeboyz, The Secret Story of Sonia Rodriguez, Nerd Girls: The Rise of the Dorkasaurus, The Downside of Being Up, Daddies Do It Different, CinderSmella, and Nerd Girls: A Catastrophe of Nerdish Proportions.

The American Library Association named Homeboyz a Top Ten Book of the Year 2008. It also received the prestigious ALA Quick Pick Recognition for young adult novel which best engages reluctant readers. The Secret Story of Sonia Rodriguez was nominated for the same award.

Sitomer is the author of Hip-Hop Poetry & the Classics, a text being used in classrooms across the United States to illuminate classic poetry through hip-hop in order to engage disengaged students in both poetry and academics.

Additionally, Sitomer has written a teacher’s methodology book for Scholastic titled Teaching Teens & Reaping Results: In a Wi-Fi, Hip-Hop, Where-Has-All-The-Sanity-Gone World.

Most recently, Sitomer has authored The Alan Sitomer BookJam. BookJams have been designed to nail core language arts standards, raise test scores, and return teachers to a position of strength. By bringing paper books back into the classroom through a student-centric approach to learning in order to achieve core curriculum objectives, teachers can utilize all the tools Alan Sitomer utilizes in his own classroom each and every day. BookJams include a host of core, standards-based activities and lesson plans as well as a spectrum of 21st-century, hands-on learning projects. Intelligent grading rubrics, differentiated assessments and award-winning literature are all included.

== Bibliography ==
The Hoopster Trilogy

- The Hoopster (2005)
- Hip Hop High School (2006)
- Homeboyz (2007)

Standalone novels

- The Secret Story of Sonia Rodriguez (2008)
- Nerd Girls: Rise of the Dorkasaurus
- The Downside of Being Up
- Nerd Girls: The Rise of the Dorkasaurus
- The Downside of Being Up
- Daddies Do It Different
- CinderSmella
- Nerd Girls: A Catastrophe of Nerdish Proportions
- Noble Warrior
- Caged Warrior
