= The Hoopster =

Book by Alan Lawrence Sitomer

- Author: Alan Lawrence Sitomer
- Language: English
- Series: Hoopster Trilogy
- Genre: Urban fiction
- Publisher: Disney Hyperion
- Publication date: 2005
- Publication place: United States
- Media type: print Paperback
- Pages: 224 pp
- ISBN: 978-0-7868-5483-7
- Followed by: Hip Hop High School

The Hoopster (2005) is a novel by American author Alan Lawrence Sitomer. It is the first book in the Hoopster Trilogy.

== Plot summary ==
The book is about a black teenager named Andre Anderson, who loves to play basketball with his white best friend Shawn and his cousin Cedric. Andre has a dream of becoming a journalist, so he tries to secure a summer job working at a magazine. Shawn thinks that Andre spends too much time on work and not enough on his social life, so he introduces Andre to a Latino girl named Gwen. Andre's boss at the magazine asks him to write an article on racism. While working on the article, Andre's life seems to be perfect until he is violently attacked by a gang of racists and is sent to hospital. His friends and family are left wondering whether or not he will ever recover from the attack.

== About the author ==
In 2003, Sitomer was named teacher of the year by the California Literacy organisation. He also had the honor of meeting former President George W. Bush when he was honored as State Teacher of the Year for California in 2007. The Hoopster is the first in a trilogy of novels by Sitomer. The third novel in the trilogy went on to win the Top Ten Picks for Reluctant Young Adult Readers award from the American Library Association in 2008.
