= Hip Hop High School =

Book by Alan Lawrence Sitomer

- Author: Alan Lawrence Sitomer
- Language: English
- Series: Hoopster Trilogy
- Genre: Urban fiction
- Publisher: Disney Hyperion
- Publication date: 2006
- Publication place: United States
- Media type: print Hardback
- Pages: 400 pp
- ISBN: 978-1-4231-0644-9
- Preceded by: The Hoopster
- Followed by: Homeboyz

Hip Hop High School (2006) is a novel by American author Alan Lawrence Sitomer. It is the second in the Hoopster Trilogy.

== Summary ==
The book takes place about five years after the events in The Hoopster. It is a story about Andre's younger sister, Theresa Anderson. Theresa begins her sophomore year at a ghetto high school. Her best friend, Cee-Saw, is constantly getting her into trouble, and due to the events of the prequel, Theresa's mother doubts Theresa's potential and expects her to fail. While in school, Theresa faces many challenges, such as her teacher, Mr. Wardin, and her friends dropping out of school due to poor grades, and family issues. During the summer, she does a report on Malcolm X that changes how she thinks about school. Theresa is then forced to make new friends, such as Devon, a tough but intelligent guy that everyone respects. A few weeks before school starts, however, Devon is attacked by a gang, which leaves Theresa to fill out all of his college applications.

== See also ==
- The Hoopster - The first book of the trilogy
- Homeboyz - The following book in the trilogy
