= Homie (rapper) =

Belarusian singer (born 1989)

HOMIE
- Born: Anton Aleksandrovich Tabala; December 23, 1989 (age 36); Belarus, Minsk, BSSR
- Origin: Belarus
- Genres: Hip hop; pop; rap rock; alternative hip hop; R&B
- Occupations: Singer; songwriter; rapper
- Years active: 2013–present

Anton Aleksandrovich Tabala (Belarusian: Антон Аляксандравіч Табала, Russian: Антон Александрович Табала; born December 23, 1989), better known as HOMIE, is a Belarusian singer, songwriter and rapper.

== Biography ==
Anton was born on December 26, 1989, in the Belarusian city of Minsk.

In his childhood, he had several hobbies: Music, football and hockey.

Sport brought the future performer to the Belarusian University of Physical Education.

Tabala played for the Minsk clubs "Dynamo-Keramin", "Youth", "Metallurg (Zhlobin)". Perhaps he would have remained in the sport if not for the injury. There is a second version that he quit studying because he did not see further prospects.

Anton left professional sports and switched to musical activity, which was interesting to him from school.

== Discography ==
- 2014 — Безумно можно быть первым (It's crazy to be the first)
- 2017 — В городе где нет тебя (There is no you in the city)
- 2019 — Прощай (ep) (Adieu)

== Book editions ==
- Красовский, Валерий (2022-05-15). Очерки с горизонта событий (in Russian). Litres. ISBN 978-5-04-378192-5.
- Кравченко, Юлия (2022-05-15). Прикоснуться к смерти (in Russian). Litres. ISBN 978-5-457-92346-1.
