= Homi Station =

Railway station in Toyota, Aichi Prefecture, Japan

Homi Station 保見駅
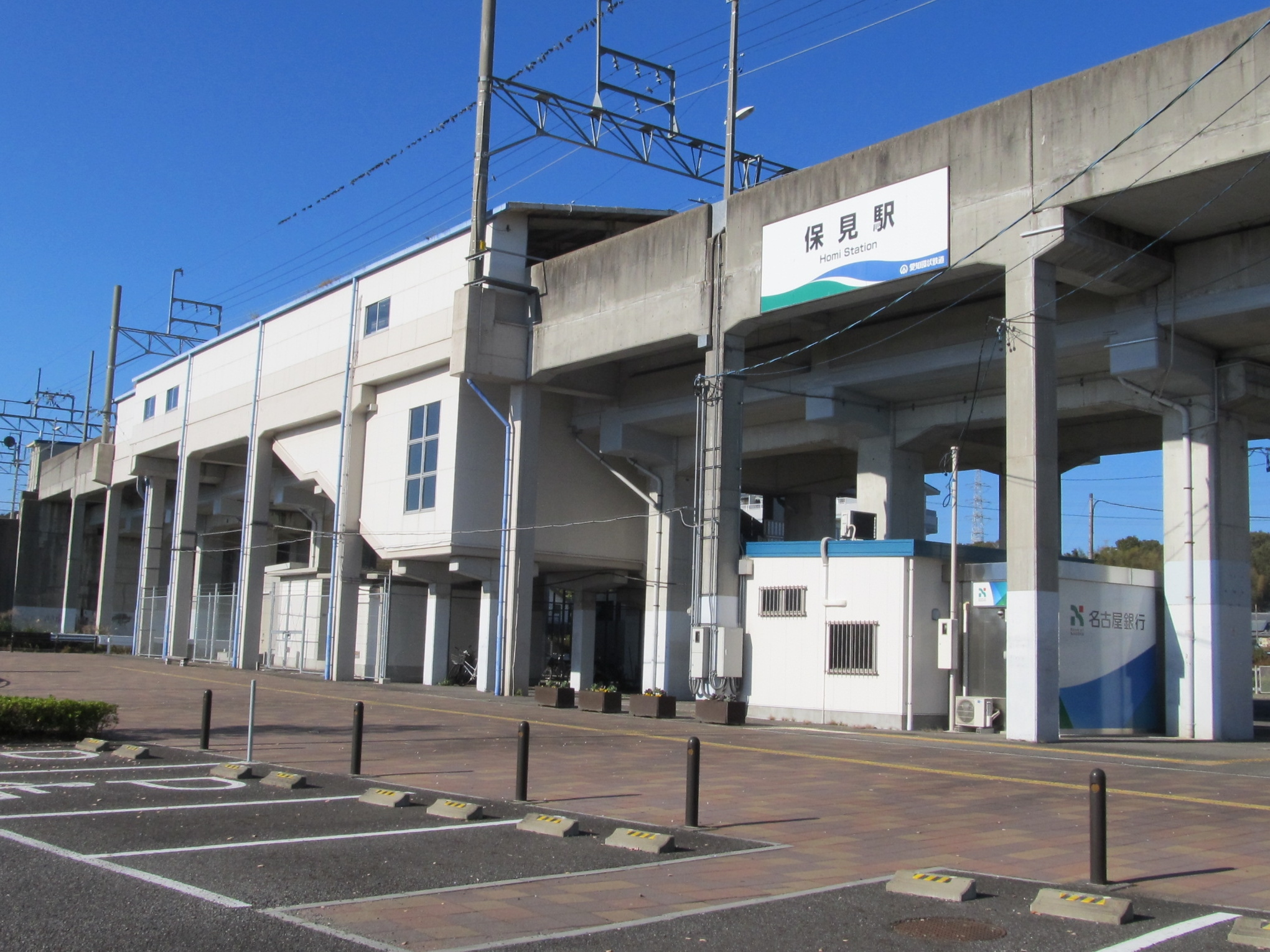
- Homi Station, November 2018

General information
- Location: Gondōbō-124-1 Homichō, Toyota-shi, Aichi-ken 470-0344; Japan
- Coordinates: 35.1366°N 137.1343°E
- Operator: Aichi Loop Railway
- Line: ■ Aichi Loop Line
- Distance: 26.8 kilometers from Okazaki
- Platforms: 2 side platforms

Other information
- Status: Staffed
- Station code: 16
- Website: Official website

History
- Opened: January 31, 1988
- Former names: Kaizu (until 2005)

Passengers
- FY2017: 1218 daily
Location
- Location within Aichi Prefecture Location within Japan

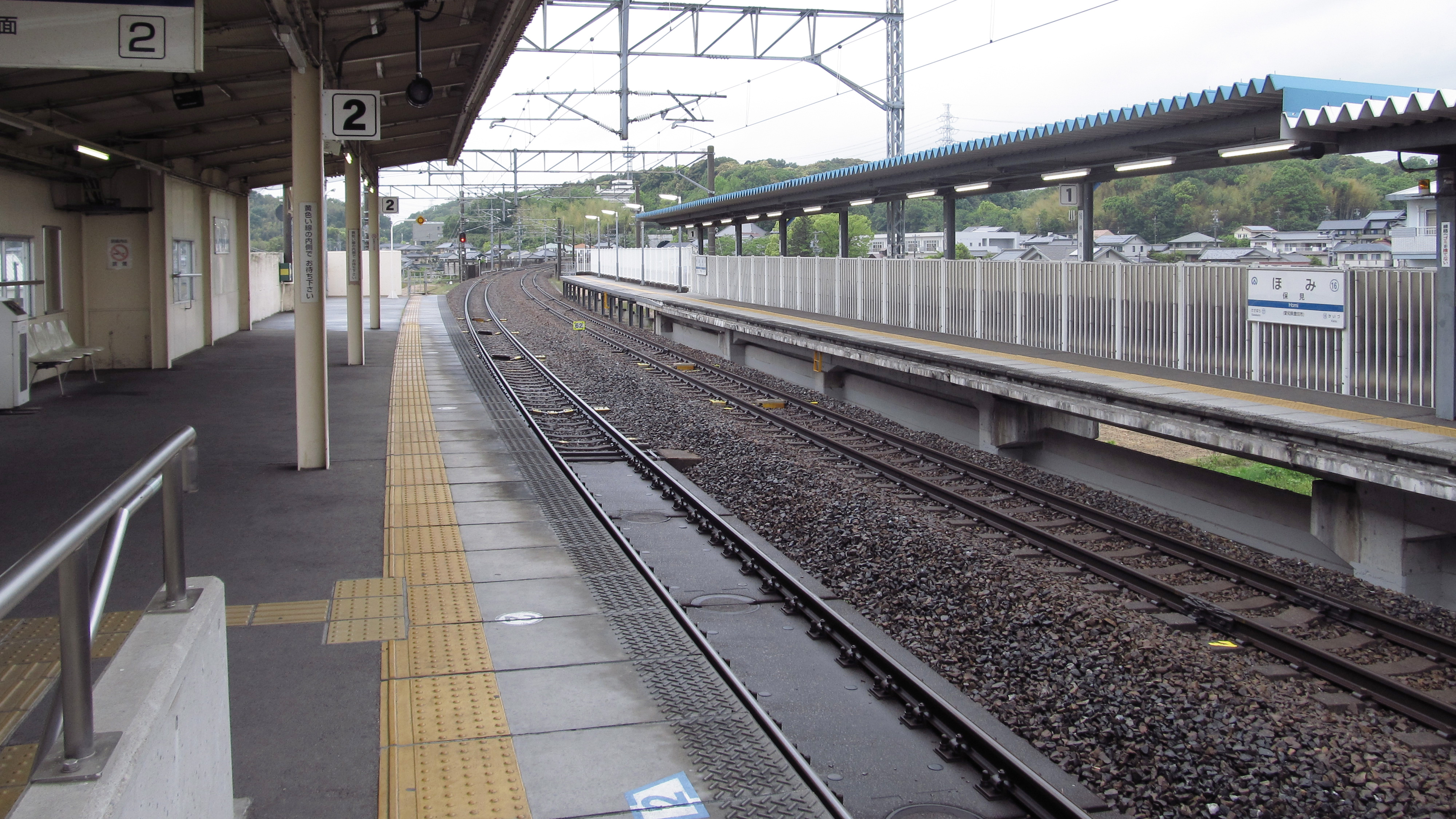
Platforms in May 2015

Homi Station (保見駅, Homi-eki) is a railway station in the city of Toyota, Aichi Prefecture, Japan, operated by the third sector Aichi Loop Railway Company.

== Lines ==
Homi Station is served by the Aichi Loop Line, and is located 26.8 kilometers from the starting point of the line at Okazaki.

== Station layout ==
The station has a two opposed elevated side platforms with the station building located underneath. The station building has automated ticket machines, TOICA automated turnstiles and is staffed.

=== Platforms ===
1	■ Aichi Loop Line	For Okazaki
2	■ Aichi Loop Line	For Kōzōji

== Adjacent stations ==
«	Service	»
Aichi Loop Line
Kaizu	-	Sasabara

== Station history ==
Homi Station was opened on March 1, 1985, initially as Kaizu Station (貝津駅). It was renamed on March 1, 2005 with the opening of the present Kaizu Station. A new station building was completed in 2009.

== Passenger statistics ==
In fiscal 2017, the station was used by an average of 1218 passengers daily.

== Surrounding area ==
- Homi Junior High School

== See also ==
- List of railway stations in Japan
