= Homeboyz (novel) =

Book by Alan Lawrence Sitomer

- Author: Alan Lawrence Sitomer
- Language: English
- Series: Hoopster Trilogy
- Genre: Urban fiction, Mystery
- Publisher: Disney Hyperion, New York
- Publication date: 2007
- Publication place: United States
- Media type: Hardback
- Pages: 283
- Preceded by: Hip Hop High School

Homeboyz is a 2007 young adult fiction novel written by California teacher Alan Lawrence Sitomer. It is the third and final book of the Hoopster Trilogy. The book won the Top Ten Picks for Reluctant Young Adult Readers award from the American Library Association in 2008.

== Summary ==
The events of Homeboyz take place four to five years after the events in Hip Hop High School. The book's main character is 17-year-old Dixon Theodore Anderson, nicknamed Teddy. Teddy is a computer hacker and a very intelligent young man, and also very tough. Teddy's entire neighborhood is overrun by gangsters and his 14-year-old sister, Tina Anderson, is killed in a crossfire. While the Anderson family mourns her death, Teddy goes to his car to seek vengeance. He is unsuccessful in getting revenge and is arrested. He then spends time in a California juvenile prison waiting for a judge to hear his case. During this time, Teddy is treated as if he was a gangster. He is set free, but is put under house arrest and is enrolled in a probation program run by Officer Mariana Diaz. Teddy is forced to spend five days each week mentoring a 12-year-old kid named Micah. Teddy has difficulty tutoring Micah because he wants to be a gangster. But through Micah, Teddy is taught how to love someone and see how people can change. The killer of his little sister is found, but he is not from the 0-1-0 gang. The shooter responsible for the murder of his little sister is Mumzy B.
