= Zhong-Yin Zhang =

Zhong-Yin Zhang is a chemist.

Zhang earned a Bachelor of Science in chemistry at Nankai University in 1984, and completed a PhD in the same field at Purdue University in 1990. Zhang split his postdoctoral research at Upjohn and the University of Michigan, then joined the faculty of the Albert Einstein College of Medicine in 1994, and was elevated to a professorship in 2002. Between 2005 and 2016, Zheng was Robert A. Harris Professor and chaired the Department of Biochemistry and Molecular Biology at the Indiana University School of Medicine, when he returned to Purdue as Distinguished Professor of Medicinal Chemistry, the Robert C. and Charlotte P. Anderson Chair in Pharmacology, and Head of the Department of Medicinal Chemistry and Molecular Pharmacology. In 2017, Zhang was elected a fellow of the American Association for the Advancement of Science, alongside two other Purdue professors, Sylvie Brouder and Thomas Hertel.
