= Homeboyz Interactive =

Defunct employment organization

Coordinates: 43°1′12.42″N 87°55′12.97″W

- Established: 1996
- Purpose: Employment for youth
- Locations: 731 W. Washington Street; Milwaukee, Wisconsin; United States
- Founder: James Holub
- Affiliations: Jesuit, HBI Consulting
- Staff: 25
- Website: Homeboyz

Homeboyz Interactive (HBI) was a faith-based recruitment, training and job placement non-profit business in Milwaukee, Wisconsin, United States, founded by a Jesuit brother in 1996 to transform gang members into productive workers.

== History ==
James Holub, a former Jesuit brother affiliated with Wheeling Jesuit University, asked gang members in the Southside of Milwaukee, WI how they could be helped, to break the cycle of poverty and violence. The youth suggested that they be trained for work they found exciting. To attract interest, the training must lead to jobs that paid at least a living wage, and computer skills seemed the most attractive. The non-profit Homeboyz Interactive was established to prepare professionals in web design, application development, and PC/network support. This non-profit outfit spawned the for-profit web design firm HBI Consulting, which provided trainees with work experience. It turned out more than 20 teachers yearly for computer and computer network programs for high schools and other clients, as well as for computer service providers. Some graduates of the program continued their education, some founded their own business, and others continued working at HBI.

The Economist described this effort as "turning thugs into programmers" on Milwaukee's South Side, which has proportionally twice as many murders as New York. Holub had "buried his 28th gang member" before he implemented the Homeboyz plan, with the understanding that "nothing stops a bullet like a job."

The programs would pass through about 80 prospects a year who successfully completed training and provide them with a job while studying for their high school equivalency test, before they were asked to decide in which direction to go. Most accepted a job or went on to community college but about 25 entered the Homeboyz training for computer programmers. Of first 150 graduates of this program none lost their job; their average pay after two years was US$63,000. Some preferred to return to full-time work at HBI. By 2002, a total of 142 people had graduated from HBI training and moved into full-time IT careers.

The training curriculum as of 2000 included JavaScript and Photoshop, among other web-development tools. In 2000, HBI received a 14% ownership stake in reEmploy.com, a payrolling company, in exchange for the development of an electronic time sheet created by the organization.

As of 2001, HBI Consulting, the for profit web design firm, had 72 clients. Among those clients were GE Medical, Toyota Forklift, Northwestern Mutual Life, Verizon Wireless, BP; and Marquette University. Companies that graduates of HBI's training programs secured positions have included Northwestern Mutual and Manpower Inc., United Community Center in Milwaukee and EKI Consulting. A pair of graduates also started their own company in 2002, Innovative Source, a web design firm, which itself has had clients such as the University of Wisconsin-Milwaukee and the Milwaukee Women's Center. This was a common path forward, graduates starting their own consulting firms.

In 2004, HBI received a grant for General Support from the Vine and Branches Foundation in the amount of US$120,000.

The product Project Foundry found its start in the difficulty of managing project-based learning across dozens of students with widely varying levels of skill, a problem encountered by Shane Krukowski, who developed the software while teaching at HBI. Krukowski subsequently an eponymous company to commercialize the software through a subscription-based business model.

Some came to Homeboyz through the criminal courts or Department of Corrections. A Jesuit Volunteer (JV) was assigned to work with the program, and to add a spiritual dimension through regular reflection together. Gradually the market began prioritizing graphic design and flash images more than site construction. After 2006 Homeboyz HBI morphed into several spinoffs and ceased to exist as a separate entity.

== See also ==
- Homeboy Industries
