= Homey (smart hub) =

Smart home hub

Homey is a smart home hub developed and manufactured by the Dutch company Athom B.V. It provides a central interface for configuring, controlling, and monitoring compatible smart-home devices.

Homey provides mobile and web applications and an open API that allows third-party developers to integrate additional devices and services. Automated routines in the Homey platform are known as "Flows".

== History ==
Homey was launched as a Kickstarter project in May 2014 by Emile Nijssen and Stefan Witkamp. Athom B.V. was subsequently established to develop the product. In 2015, the company received €1 million in investment from private investors.

In July 2024, LG Electronics acquired an 80% stake in Athom in a transaction reported to value the company at approximately US$61 million.

== Models ==
=== Homey (2016) ===
The first Homey was released in 2016 following its 2014 Kickstarter campaign. The first-generation device included a built-in microphone and speech recognition software, allowing it to function as both a smart speaker and a smart home hub.

The device supported Wi-Fi, Bluetooth, Zigbee, Z-Wave, 433 MHz, 868 MHz, and infrared communication.

=== Homey (2019) ===
A second-generation Homey was introduced in 2019. Compared with the original model, it removed the near-field communication module and built-in microphone. The microphone was removed because Athom determined that its performance was insufficient for the intended functionality.

=== Homey Pro (2019) ===
The Homey Pro was launched alongside the second-generation Homey in 2019. It featured more powerful hardware than the standard model, including 1 GB of random-access memory and a dual-core processor.

=== Homey Bridge ===
Homey Bridge was announced during a live stream on 7 September 2021 as a wireless device intended to provide connectivity for Homey's cloud-based services.

It supports Wi-Fi, Bluetooth Low Energy, Zigbee, Z-Wave, 433 MHz, and infrared.

=== Homey Pro (2023) ===
A new generation of Homey Pro debuted on 12 October 2022 and began shipping in the first quarter of 2023.

The device uses a flat design similar to the Homey Bridge and is based on the Raspberry Pi Compute Module 4. It has a quad-core processor, 2 GB of RAM, and 8 GB of flash storage.

Supported technologies include Wi-Fi, Bluetooth Low Energy, Zigbee, Z-Wave, 433 MHz, infrared, Matter, and Thread.

=== Homey Energy Dongle ===
The Homey Energy Dongle was introduced in 2024. It allows compatible Homey systems to monitor electricity consumption from digital electricity meters equipped with a P1 port, an interface used by smart meters in several European countries.

The device can also retrieve gas-consumption data when the electricity meter provides access to a connected gas meter.

The Energy Dongle is compatible with Homey Pro, Homey Pro mini, Homey Self-Hosted Server, and Homey Cloud.

=== Homey Pro mini ===
Homey Pro mini was first released in 2024 as a smaller Homey hub designed primarily for local operation.

The device supports Zigbee, Matter, Thread, and Ethernet. It is based on the Raspberry Pi Compute Module 4 and has a quad-core processor, 1 GB of RAM, and 8 GB of flash storage.

=== Homey Pro (2026) ===
Homey Pro (2026) became available in late 2025. It retains the design of the 2023 Homey Pro but increases the amount of RAM to 4 GB.

Like the 2023 model, it is based on the Raspberry Pi Compute Module 4 and has a quad-core processor and 8 GB of flash storage.

The supported technologies include Wi-Fi, Bluetooth Low Energy, Zigbee, Z-Wave, 433 MHz, infrared, Matter, and Thread.

=== Homey Self-Hosted Server ===
Homey Self-Hosted Server was released in December 2025. It is based on the operating system used by Homey Pro and is designed to run on user-owned hardware.

Supported platforms include Raspberry Pi, Linux, macOS, Microsoft Windows, Docker, Proxmox, TrueNAS, QNAP, Synology, and Unraid.

The system supports Matter, LAN integrations, and services that connect through cloud APIs. Matter-over-Thread can also be used when a Thread Border Router is available.

When used with Homey Bridge, the system can additionally connect to devices using Bluetooth Low Energy, Zigbee, Z-Wave, 433 MHz, and infrared. Cloud-based features include remote access, access to the Homey App Store, and integration with voice assistants.

=== Homey Portal ===
Homey Portal joined the portfolio in September 2026 as a dedicated controller for a specific room or zone, working seamlessly with Homey Cloud, Homey Pro, Homey Pro mini, and Homey Self-Hosted Server.

Available with either a wall mount or table stand, Homey Portal combines a 2.8-inch round touchscreen with a stainless steel rotary ring. Users can control devices in a room or zone with a simple tap on the screen or twist of the ring.

Through Homey Flow, Homey Portal can also be extended to display custom notifications, making it useful not only for control, but also for bringing relevant information and alerts into the room.

== Supported devices and services ==
Homey supports integrations with devices and services from a range of smart-home platforms and manufacturers, including Philips Hue, IKEA, Google Nest, Chromecast, Logitech Harmony, Spotify Connect, and Sonos.

Athom states that Homey supports more than 70,000 devices from more than 2,000 brands.

== Reception ==
=== Homey Pro ===
Independent reviews of Homey Pro have been published by several technology publications, including:

- Trusted Reviews – Homey Pro 2026 Review
- The Ambient – Homey Pro 2026 review
- Android Authority – Homey Pro review
- Heise – Smart-home systems test
- Stiftung Warentest – Homey test
- Tweakers – Athom Homey Pro review
- M3 – Homey review
- Datormagazin – Homey Pro 2026 test
- Ljud & Bild – Homey Pro 2026 test

=== Homey Pro mini ===
Independent reviews of Homey Pro mini include:

- Trusted Reviews – Homey Pro Mini Review
- How-To Geek – Homey Pro Mini review
- Android Authority – Homey Pro Mini review
- Tweakers – Homey Pro Mini review
- IT Magazine – Homey Pro Mini review
- The Ambient – Homey Pro Mini review
- Heise – Homey Pro Mini review
- Recordere – Homey Pro Mini review
- inDomus – Homey Pro mini review

== See also ==
- Home Assistant
- Google Nest
- HomePod
- Internet of things
