= East Los Angeles College =

Community college in Monterey Park, California, US

Coordinates: 34.0416°N 118.1500°W

- Motto: Vitam amplificare hominibus hominesque societati (Latin)
- Motto in English: To improve life for people and for society.
- Type: Public community college
- Established: 1945
- Parent institution: California Community Colleges System, Los Angeles Community College District
- President: Alberto J. Román
- Students: 35,403
- Location: Monterey Park, California, United States
- District: LACCD
- Colors: Green and white
- Sporting affiliations: CCCAA – South Coast Conference
- Mascot: The Husky
- Website: www.elac.edu

East Los Angeles College (ELAC) is a public community college in Monterey Park, California, a suburb of Los Angeles. It is part of the California Community Colleges System and the Los Angeles Community College District. With fourteen communities comprising its primary service area and an enrollment of 35,403 students, ELAC had the largest student body campus by enrollment in the state of California as of 2018. It was situated in northeastern East Los Angeles before that part of unincorporated East Los Angeles was annexed by Monterey Park in the early 1970s. ELAC offers associate degrees and certificates.

== History ==
At the end of World War II, Los Angeles faced the need for another city college to accommodate the vast numbers of servicemen returning from deployment. Los Angeles City College (LACC) was the first city college serving Los Angeles, and by the war's end, it remained the only one in the area. Limited and costly transportation hindered the number of students who could attend LACC. Meanwhile, the Eastside was rapidly evolving into the city's industrial hub.

Arthur Baum, the editor of the East Los Angeles Tribune, led a citizens' committee, composed of presidents of various clubs and organizations in the community. The committee included Principal D. Raymond Brothers of Garfield High School, County Supervisor Smith, Superintendent Kersey, and several industrial leaders. They presented the proposition of establishing a junior college to the Los Angeles City Board of Education in a special meeting on March 1, 1945. The Los Angeles Board of Education voted in favor, leading to the establishment of a Junior College on the Garfield High School campus in June 1945. This marked the creation of East Los Angeles College, only the second city college (or junior college) serving the Los Angeles area.

The college commenced classes on September 4, 1945, operating on the Garfield High School campus with an initial enrollment of 373 students and 19 faculty members, even though the school board had authorized a faculty of 25, drawn from the LACC staff. Of these, 107 students attended college classes at Garfield, while 266 pursued health careers at L.A. County Hospital, primarily in nursing. The junior college was part of the Los Angeles City Public Schools system (now part of the L.A. Unified School District)."

On September 19, 1945, the first edition of the Campus News (a temporary newspaper) for the college was published. On September 25, a constitution for the Junior College was adopted and presented during an assembly. The college had to cope with the significant number of returning servicemen (veterans) enrolling, thanks to the G.I. Bill, as approximately 50,000 men were being discharged in the state each month.

The college relocated to its current 82-acre (33 ha) site on Avenida Cesar Chavez in February 1948. It is situated six miles from the Los Angeles Civic Center. A portion of the 2005 movie Goal! was filmed at the ELAC Weingart Stadium. The ELAC men's basketball team is prominently featured in the Netflix series Last Chance U: Basketball, a spin-off of the original Last Chance U, which premiered on March 10, 2021.

East Los Angeles College will offer the state's first community college program in Central American studies.

=== College presidents ===
Presidents of ELAC	Years as president
Rosco Ingalls	1945 – 1955
Benjamin K. Swartz	1955 – 1967
John K. Wells	1967 – 1978
Armando Rodriguez	1973 – 1978
Arthur D. Avila	1979 – 1988
Omero Suarez	1988 – 1993
Ernest H. Moreno	1994 – 2011
Marvin Martinez	2013 – 2019
Alberto J. Roman	2020 – Present

=== South Gate Campus ===
The East Los Angeles College (ELAC) South Gate Campus is an extension of East Los Angeles College, created to expand its academic services to the southeast corridor of Los Angeles. Construction of the new South Gate campus began in 2019 on the former site of Firestone Tire and Rubber Co., with an expected opening in fall 2022. On March 22, 2021, the California Community Colleges Board of Governors officially approved the South Gate Campus as an 'education center.

=== Performing Arts and Theatrical Expression ===
ELAC is home to the Vincent Price Art Museum, a contemporary art museum named in honor of the American actor and art collector, Vincent Price. In 1957, inspired by the students' spirit and the community's need to experience original artworks firsthand, Vincent and Mary Grant Price donated 90 pieces from their private collection to establish the museum. It was the first 'teaching art collection' owned by a community college in the United States. Over their lifetimes, the Price family ultimately donated 2,000 pieces, and the museum's permanent collection now boasts over 9,000 pieces valued at over $5 million.

In 1974, Roberto Esteban Chavez painted The Path to Knowledge and the False University, a 200-foot mural on the East Los Angeles Community College campus, where he served as an arts educator and chair of the Chicano Studies department. Although the college destroyed the mural, its impact and the political questions surrounding its destruction were documented in two museum exhibits: 'Roberto Chavez and The False University: A Retrospective' at the Vincent Price Museum and "Murales Rebeldes: L.A. Chicana/o Murals under Siege" as part of the Pacific Standard Time: LA/LA Beyond Borders initiative in 2017.

== Student life ==
Student body composition as of 2022
Race and ethnicity	Total
Hispanic	66%
Unknown	10%
Asian	9%
White	8%
Black	5%
Two or more races (Note: Other consists of Multiracial Americans & those who prefer to not say.)	1%
Foreign national	1%
Gender Distribution
Male	47%
Female	53%
Age Distribution
Under 18	8%
18–24	40%
25–64	52%

The school follows a semester-based academic year. The student-faculty ratio is 34-to-1. For the 2017–2018 academic year, in-state tuition and fees were $1,220, while out-of-state tuition and fees were $7,746. There is no application fee. As of fall 2018, the total enrollment at ELAC was 35,403, with 7,810 full-time students and 27,593 part-time students. The total number of entering students for fall 2017 was 34,697, with 8,538 full-time students and 26,569 part-time students.

The popular programs include: Social Sciences, Homeland Security, Law Enforcement, Firefighting and Related Protective Services, and Business, Management, Marketing, and Related Support Services.

=== Honors Program ===
The East Los Angeles Honors Program, recognized by the UC system, the Claremont Colleges, Occidental College, and Loyola Marymount, offers rigorous courses designed to help students transfer and successfully transition to four-year universities. The Honors Program is open to both part-time and full-time students and requires a 3.0 GPA to apply and be considered for enrollment. Successful completion of the Honors Program guarantees priority consideration for admission at 11 four-year universities throughout California and Washington.

=== Rankings ===
In 2016, the school was ranked 13th for the Best 2-Year College for adult learners in 'America's Best Colleges for Adult Learners' by Washington Monthly. In 2019, it achieved the top ranking in California and the 6th position nationwide for awarding degrees and certificates to Hispanic students, as reported by Hispanic Outlook on Education Magazine.

== Engagement with local high schools ==
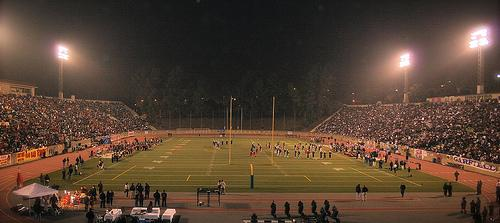
East LA Classic halftime at Weingart Stadium.

ELAC's Weingart Stadium, located on its football field, serves as the venue for graduation ceremonies of local high schools, including Garfield High School in East Los Angeles. The stadium also hosts the annual "East L.A. Classic" football game, featuring a matchup between Garfield and Theodore Roosevelt High School. This event traditionally draws over 20,000 fans, with notable figures like U.S. Senate candidate Congresswoman Loretta Sanchez even in attendance at the 2016 game.

Billy McMillin, a first-time director, won the 2017 storytelling award at the LA Film Festival for his documentary film The Classic about the football game.

== Notable alumni ==
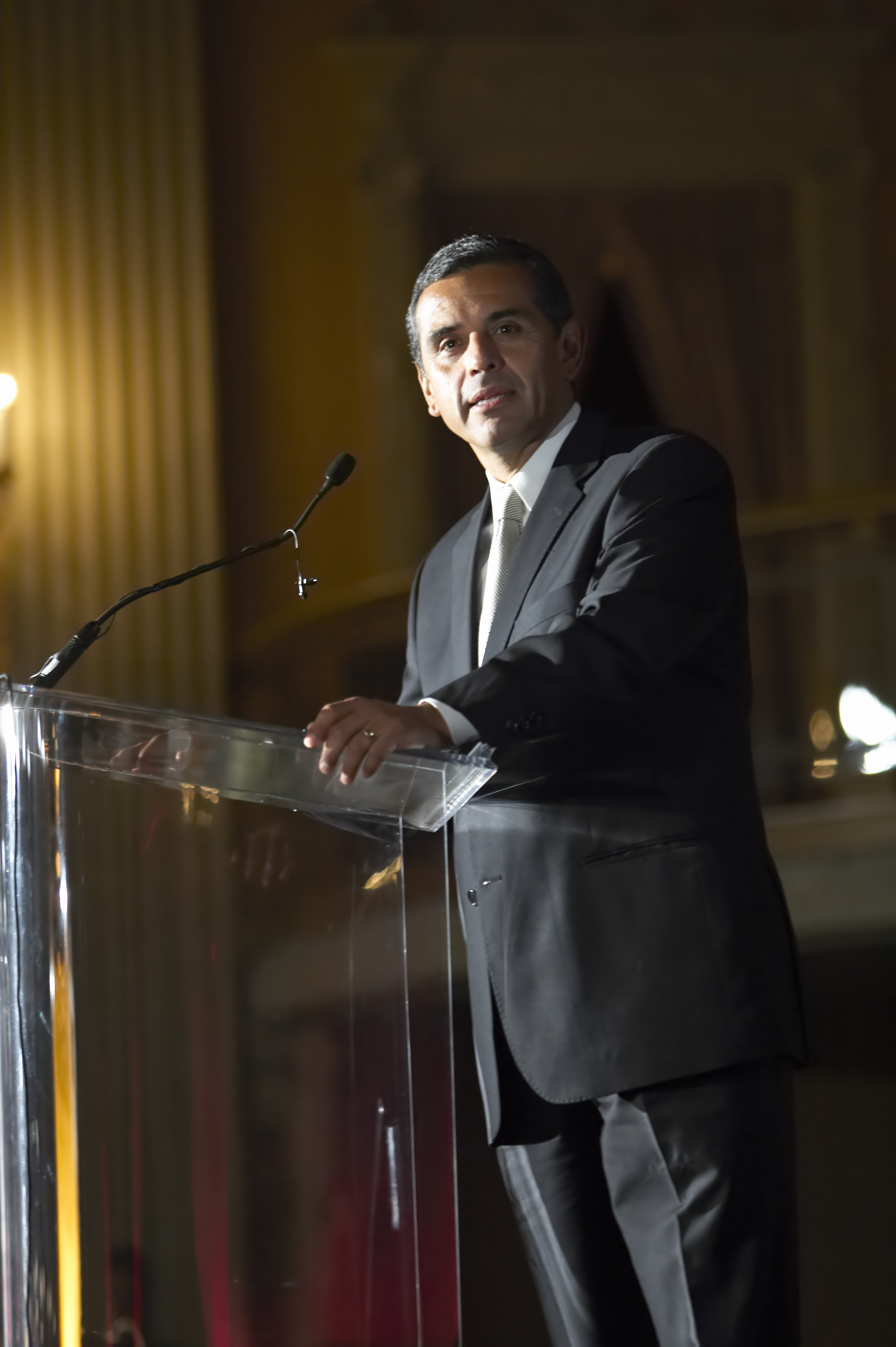
ELAC alumnus Antonio Villaraigosa

- Leroy D. Baca, former Sheriff of Los Angeles
- Raymond Cruz, actor
- Ben Davidson, professional football player
- Clarence Davis, professional football player
- Katrina Dimaranan, beauty queen, actress, host, Binibining Pilipinas-Tousim 2012, Miss Supranational USA 2018, Miss Supranational 2018 1st runner-up
- Mike Fong, California State Assembly from the 49th district
- Antoinette Harris, college football player
- Max Iheanachor, NFL football player
- Ethan Katz, professional baseball coach
- David Scott Lawrence, scientist
- Gloria Molina, Los Angeles County Supervisor
- Sylvia Mosqueda, long-distance runner
- Julian Nava, former U.S. Ambassador to Mexico, writer
- Edward James Olmos, actor
- Bob Pacheco, former 60th District Assemblyman
- Richard Polanco, former California State Senate Majority leader and member of the California State Assembly
- Ruben Quesada, poet, editor, board member at the National Book Critics Circle
- Luis J. Rodriguez, poet, novelist, journalist, critic, columnist, and Los Angeles Poet Laureate
- Susan Rubio, Member of the California State Senate from the 22nd
- Alexander Salazar auxiliary bishop of the Archdiocese of Los Angeles from 2004 to 2018.
- Ruben Salazar, reporter
- Dennis Sanchez, founder of East Side Spirit and Pride
- Arthur Torres, California Democratic Party chairman
- Esteban Edward Torres, former United States Ambassador to UNESCO, Special Assistant to President Jimmy Carter, and U.S. Congress Member
- Kent Twitchell, muralist
- Antonio Villaraigosa, former mayor of Los Angeles
- Albert C. Zapanta, businessman and politician

== Faculty ==
- Judy Chu, an American politician serving as a U.S. Representative

== See also ==
- Howard E. Dorsey, Los Angeles City Council member, 1937, supported establishing new college in East Los Angeles
