= Always Running =

1993 book by Luis J. Rodriguez

Always Running: La Vida Loca, Gang Days in L.A.
- First hardcover edition (1993)
- Author: Luis J. Rodriguez
- Language: English
- Publisher: Curbstone Press
- Publication date: 1993
- Publication place: United States
- Media type: Print (Hardback & Paperback)
- Pages: 251
- ISBN: 1880684063

Always Running: La Vida Loca, Gang Days in L.A. is a 1993 autobiographical book by Mexican-American author Luis J. Rodriguez. In the book, Rodriguez recounts his days as a member of a street gang in Los Angeles (specifically, East Los Angeles and the city's eastern suburbs).

The book has been highly acclaimed and contrasted with the works of Louis-Ferdinand Celine and George Orwell's Down and Out in Paris and London in its description of the lives of desperate, impoverished individuals in big cities.

== Reception ==
Always Running has frequently landed on the American Library Association's listed of the most banned and challenged books in the United States. Between 1990 and 1999, the book landed the 85th spot of the 100 most banned and challenged books. It ranked 68th for 2000–2009.
