= Luis J. Rodriguez =

American poet and writer (born 1954)

Luis Javier Rodriguez
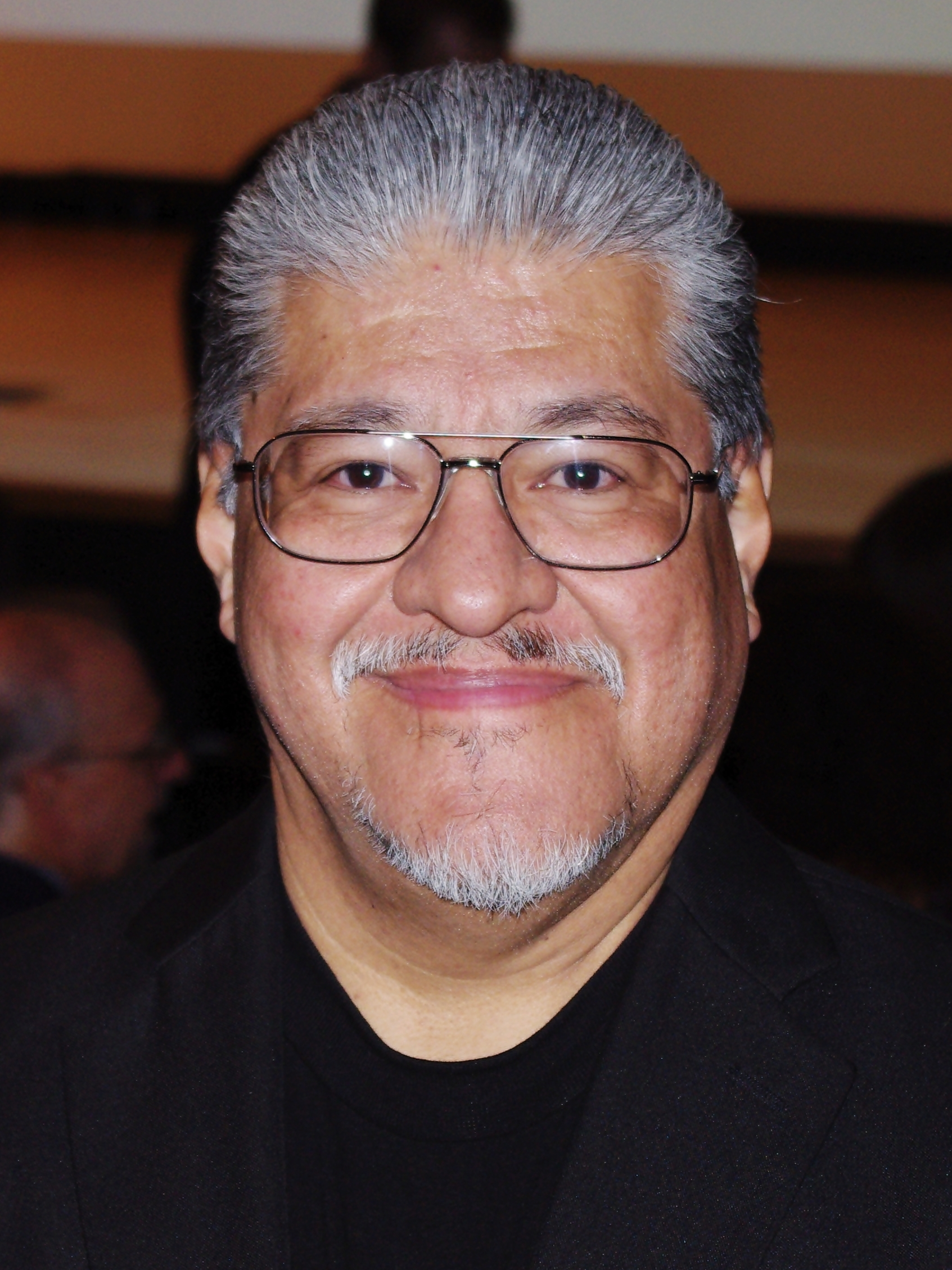
- Rodriguez in 2012
- Born: Luis Javier Rodriguez; 1954 (age 71–72); El Paso, Texas, U.S.
- Occupations: Poet; politician; author
- Known for: Always Running: La Vida Loca, Gang Days in L.A.
- Political party: Green
- Other political affiliations: Justice

Los Angeles Poet Laureate
- In office 2014–2015
- Preceded by: Eloise Klein Healy
- Succeeded by: Robin Coste Lewis

Luis Javier Rodriguez (born 1954) is an American poet, novelist, journalist, critic, and columnist. He was the 2014 Los Angeles Poet Laureate. Rodriguez is recognized as a major figure in contemporary Chicano literature, identifying himself as a native Xicanx writer. His best-known work, Always Running: La Vida Loca, Gang Days in L.A., received the Carl Sandburg Literary Award and has been controversial on school reading lists for its depictions of gang life.

The founder and co-founder of nonprofit organizations including Tía Chucha's Centro Cultural, Rodriguez has been active in politics. Rodriguez was the 2012 vice-presidential nominee of the Justice Party. In 2014, Rodriguez ran as the Green Party of California's candidate for Governor of California and received 66,872 votes (1.5 percent of the vote) in the June primary. He ran again as candidate in the 2022 California gubernatorial election, endorsed by the Green Party and the Peace and Freedom Party.

== Early life ==
Rodriguez was born in the United States-Mexico border city of El Paso, Texas. His parents, natives of Ciudad Juárez, Chihuahua, had their children on the US side of the border to ease the transition there, where they had intentions of relocating.

In Ciudad Juarez, his father was a high school principal, but in Los Angeles he worked in a dog food factory, a paint factory, in construction, and selling pots and pans and Bibles. He retired as a laboratory custodian at Pierce Community College in Woodland Hills, California, a wealthier neighborhood in Los Angeles. Luis's mother, who is descended from the Raramuri, a people indigenous to Chihuahua, was a school secretary in Mexico, but in Los Angeles she worked cleaning homes and in the garment industry when she was not taking care of the children.

=== Legal issues ===
During the 1960s and 1970s, Luis was an active gang member and drug user in East Los Angeles, developing a long rap sheet. However, his criminal activity did not preclude his participation in the Chicano Movement, and he joined the 1968 East L.A. walkouts and took part in the August 31, 1970 Chicano Moratorium against the Vietnam War. At the moratorium, he was brutalized and arrested along with numerous other peaceful protesters.

However, unlike other arrestees, Luis with four other "cholos" (Chicano gang youth) was held briefly in the Murderer's Row of the Hall of Justice Jail and threatened with charges in the three persons killed during subsequent rioting after law enforcement attacked a mostly-peaceful crowd. He had a cell next to Charles Manson. He was later released with no charges filed.

Luis found a mentor through the John Fabela Youth Center, part of the Bienvenidos Community Center in South San Gabriel, who recognized Luis' capacity as a graffiti writer and community leader. With this mentor's help, in 1972 Luis painted several murals in the San Gabriel Valley communities of Rosemead and South San Gabriel. Although Luis dropped out of high school at 15, he later returned and graduated from Mark Keppel High School in Alhambra, where he led school walkouts and became president of To Help Mexican American Students (TOHMAS).

He got arrested for "assault with intent to commit murder" at 17 in an incident in which four people were shot, but witnesses failed to identify him and he was released. He later attended California State University, Los Angeles briefly from 1972 to 1973, becoming a member of the Chicano activist group MEChA but eventually dropped out.

The two currents in his life came to an inevitable head when at 18, a sentence imposed for a criminal conviction in a case in which Luis had tried to stop the police beating of a young Mexican woman, who was handcuffed and on the ground, was mitigated by letters of support from community members who saw his potential. Feeling a sense of indebtedness to those who had helped him, Luis decided to quit heroin and other drugs and gang life, dedicating himself to Marxist study and revolutionary community organizing.

== Career ==
In 1980, he began attending night school at East Los Angeles College and working as a writer/photographer for several East Los Angeles area publications. That summer, he attended a workshop for minority journalists at UC Berkeley, after which he covered crime and other urban issues for the San Bernardino Sun. At the same time, he continued to be active in East Los Angeles, leading a group of barrio writers and publishing ChismeArte, a Chicano art journal, out of an office at Self Help Graphics & Art. He began facilitating writing workshops and talks in prisons and juvenile lockups in 1980 starting in Chino Prison. In the early 1980s, he also worked for the American Federation of State, County and Municipal Employees, in public radio, and as a freelance journalist, including covering indigenous uprisings in Mexico and the Contra War in Nicaragua and Honduras, until he moved to Chicago in 1985. There, he was editor of the People's Tribune, linked to the League of Revolutionaries for a New America, for three years, then a typesetter for the Liturgy Training Publications of the Archdiocese of Chicago, and a writer/reporter for WMAQ-AM, All News Radio. Luis became active in the Chicago poetry scene, birthplace of the Poetry Slam, and founded Tia Chucha Press to publish his first book. "Poems Across the Pavement." and the books of leading Chicago poets, later doing the same on a national level. His readings and talks extended to prisons around the country as well as homeless shelters, migrant camps, Native American reservations, public & private schools, colleges, universities, libraries, and conferences.

In 1993, Curbstone Press of Willimantic, CT published Luis's first memoir, Always Running as a cautionary tale for his son Ramiro, who joined a Chicago street gang at the age of fifteen. The following year, Touchstone Books/Simon & Schuster released the paperback. In 1994, Luis became a poet/teacher for men's conferences sponsored by the Mosaic Multicultural Foundation, founded by mythologist/storyteller Michael Meade, and co-founded Youth Struggling for Survival (YSS) to work with gang and non-gang youth and their families. His son Ramiro and his daughter Andrea were also founding members. In addition, Luis began Native American and Native Mexican spiritual practices in 1995 with elder/teachers among the Lakota, Navajo (Dine), Mexica, and Mayan nations. However, Ramiro began state prison terms at age 17 for various violent acts, eventually serving a total of fifteen years, including thirteen and a half years for three counts of attempted murder. Ramiro was released in July 2010.

In 1998, Rodriguez received the Hispanic Heritage Award for Literature. He has been awarded other prizes for his writing and community work, including the Lila Wallace-Reader's Digest Writer's Award, three PEN Josephine Miles Literary Awards, a Lannan Poetry Fellowship, a Poetry Center Book Award of San Francisco State University, a Paterson Poetry Prize, and a Get Lit Players Ignite Award. Over the years, Luis received other recognition, including a writers "Walk of Fame" signature and hand print on cement at Vroman's Bookstore in Pasadena, CA; the Spirit of Struggle/Ruben Salazar award from InnerCity Struggle, "Hero of the Community" from KCET-TV and Union Bank, "Hero of Nonviolence" by the Agape Christian Center, and as an "Unsung Hero of Compassion," presented by the Dalai Lama. In 1993, Luis also received a Dorothea Lange-Paul Taylor Prize in Journalism with photojournalist Donna De Cesare to cover Salvadoran gang youth in Los Angeles and El Salvador.

In 2000, Luis moved his family, then consisting of his third wife Trini and their two young sons, Ruben and Luis, to the San Fernando Valley section of Los Angeles. His daughter Andrea and his granddaughter Catalina later joined them. In 2001, Luis helped create Tia Chucha's Cafe Cultural in Sylmar CA with his wife Trini and their brother-in-law Enrique Sanchez, and in 2003 the nonprofit Tia Chucha's Centro Cultural and Bookstore with Angelica Loa Perez and Victor Mendoza. In 2005, he brought Tia Chucha Press, now a renowned small press with more than 50 books of cross-cultural poets, to Los Angeles.

In 2012, Luis was co-editor with Denise Sandoval of Rushing Waters, Rising Dreams: How the Arts are Transforming a Community (Tia Chucha Press), which in 2013 won an award from the Independent Publishers Association at the annual Book Expo gathering in New York City. He was also co-producer of the documentary of the same name, written and directed by John F. Cantu. The film and book were shown across the country, including in San Francisco, Oakland, Chicago, Pasadena, the Napa Valley, East L.A., and other cities.

Beginning in 2014, Luis served as a script consultant on three TV shows: Fox's Gang Related, Hulu's East Los High, and FX's Snowfall. He became Grand Marshall for the Latino Heritage Parade in Pasadena, CA and the Mendez High School Parade in Boyle Heights, Los Angeles. In 2019, Casa 0101 Theater in Boyle Heights, produced the full staged version of Always Running, co-adapted by Luis J. Rodriguez and Hector Rodriguez, selling out every weekend since August 31 and extended three times.

In October 2011, he became a co-founder of the Network for Revolutionary Change in Chicago, dedicated to bringing together revolutionary leaders, thinkers, and activists from throughout the United States to plan, strategize, and organize social justice, equity, and peace through cooperation, imagination, and meaningful actions. In 2018, he became active in the National Poor People's Campaign, spearheaded by the Reverend William Barber and the Reverend Liz Theoharis.

=== Los Angeles Poet Laureate ===
On October 9, 2014, Rodriguez was named the second Los Angeles Poet Laureate by Mayor Eric Garcetti, succeeding Eloise Klein Healy. "During his four-term, he is expected to compose poems to the city, host at least six readings, hold at least six classes or workshops at public library branches and serve as a cultural ambassador," according to the Los Angeles Times.

== Politics ==
=== Early political activities ===
Luis ran for Los Angeles School Board in 1977 in a "Vote Communist" campaign after the California Supreme Court validated the right to run such campaigns based on the First Amendment. In addition, he worked as a bus driver, truck driver, in construction, a paper mill, a lead foundry, a chemical refinery, and a steel mill, learning the millwright trade, carpentry, maintenance mechanics, and welding. At the same time, Luis helped with various gang peace truces and urban peace efforts throughout the Los Angeles area.

=== 2012 United States presidential election ===
The Justice Party was organized in November 2011 by a group of political activists including former mayor of Salt Lake City Rocky Anderson as an alternative to what they saw as a duopoly of the two major political parties. Anderson was the party's first presidential nominee. In July 2012, Anderson selected Rodriguez to be his vice presidential running mate.

Rodriguez and Anderson were officially on the ballot in fifteen states and achieved recognized write-in status in twenty-five more. The 2012 ticket received 43,018 votes, equal to approximately 0.03% of the total.

=== 2014 California gubernatorial election ===
In 2014, Rodriguez was endorsed by the Green Party of California to be its Gubernatorial candidate in the "Top Two" primary election. It was the first California governor's race using the new top two system in which the top two vote-getters advance to November's general election, regardless of party. Rodriguez received 66,872 votes for 1.5 percent of the vote. He came in sixth—first among independents and third-party candidates, but did not advance to the November election.

Rodriguez's positions included a focus on clean and green energy and jobs, developing a Single-payer health care system, imposing a severance tax on oil companies, ending the California prison system, and ending poverty in California. A key concern for Rodriguez, economic inequality, is described in his campaign document "A New Vision for California":

There have always been two states – one ripe for developers, corporations, financial institutions, and robber barons. The other state consists of the working class and poor, including immigrant whites and Asians, African Americans, natives, Mexicans, and refugees from El Salvador, Guatemala, Honduras, Armenia, Southeast Asia, the Middle East, and elsewhere. ... Here is the California story we can't cover up or push aside: increased job eliminations, evictions, [and] home foreclosures as well as cuts in welfare and needed services in the face of a deepening poverty-creating economic crisis. Which way for California? Which way for the country?

Rodriguez cited failures by incumbent Jerry Brown, stating, "with Governor Brown's budget cuts, his stand on prisons, the ensuing growth of poverty under his watch, he's just another bead on a long string of unresponsive pro-corporate politicians." In an interview with Truthout, in May 2014, Rodriguez also criticized Brown's policies on incarceration, stating:

Governor Brown has proposed a $10 billion prison budget. I would stop warehousing people (and generating better criminals at taxpayers' expense) and provide rehabilitation, restorative justice practices, alternative sentencing, mental and drug treatment, healing circles, the arts, training and jobs. As proven around the country and world, this is far cheaper and more effective.

=== 2022 California gubernatorial election ===
Rodriguez ran for Governor of California as a Green Party and Peace and Freedom Party candidate in 2022. In the June primary he received 1.8% of the vote with the support of 124,456 California voters.

== Awards ==
- Carl Sandburg Literary Award
- Chicago Sun-Times Book Award
- San Francisco State University Poetry Center Award (1989)
- Duke University Lange-Taylor Prize (1993)
- Lila Wallace Reader's Digest Writer's Award (1996)
- Hispanic Heritage Award (1999)
- PEN Josephine Miles Literary Award (1992, 2003, 2013)
- Paterson Poetry Prize (2005)
- Robert Kirsch Award for lifetime achievement (2022)
- Pegasus Award for Service in Poetry (2026)

== Bibliography ==
=== Poetry ===
- Rodriguez, Luis. J (1989). Poems Across the Pavement. Tía Chucha Press. ISBN 0-9624287-0-1.
- Rodriguez, Luis. J (1991). The Concrete River: Poems. Curbstone Press. ISBN 0-915306-42-5.
- Rodriguez, Luis. J (1998). Trochemoche: Poems. Curbstone Press. ISBN 1-880684-50-0.
- Rodriguez, Luis. J (2005). My Nature is Hunger: New & Selected Poems, 1989-2004. Curbstone Press/Rattle Edition. ISBN 1-931896-24-0.
- Rodriguez, Luis. J (2016). Borrowed Bones: New Poems from the Poet Laureate of Los Angeles. Curbstone Books/Northwestern University Press. ISBN 978-0-8101-3364-8.

=== Nonfiction ===
- Rodriguez, Luis J. (1993). Always Running: La Vida Loca, Gang Days in L.A. Willimantic, CT: Curbstone Press. ISBN 1-880684-06-3.
- Rodriguez, Luis J. (2001). Hearts and Hands: Creating Community in Violent Times. New York, NY: Seven Stories Press. ISBN 1-58322-263-4.
- Rodriguez, Luis J. (2011). It Calls You Back: An Odyssey Through Love, Addiction, Revolutions, and Healing. New York, NY: Atria Books. ISBN 9781416584179.
- Rodriguez, Luis J. (2019). From Our Land to Our Land: Essays, Journeys, and Imaginings from a Native Xicanx Writer. New York, NY: Seven Stories Press. ISBN 9781609809720.

=== Fiction ===
- Rodriguez, Luis J. (1996). América is Her Name. Willimantic, CT: Curbstone Press. ISBN 1-880684-40-3.
- Rodriguez, Luis J. (1999). It Doesn't Have to be This Way: A Barrio Story / No tiene que ser así : una historia del barrio. San Francisco, California: Children's Book Press. ISBN 0-89239-161-8.
- Rodriguez, Luis J. (2002). The Republic of East L.A.: Stories. New York City: Rayo. ISBN 0-06-621263-4.
- Rodriguez, Luis J. (2005). Music of the Mill: A Novel. New York City: Rayo. ISBN 0-06-056076-2.

== Discography ==
- My Name's Not Rodriguez, Dos Manos Records
