= Laboratory safety =

Risks and prevention of laboratory accidents

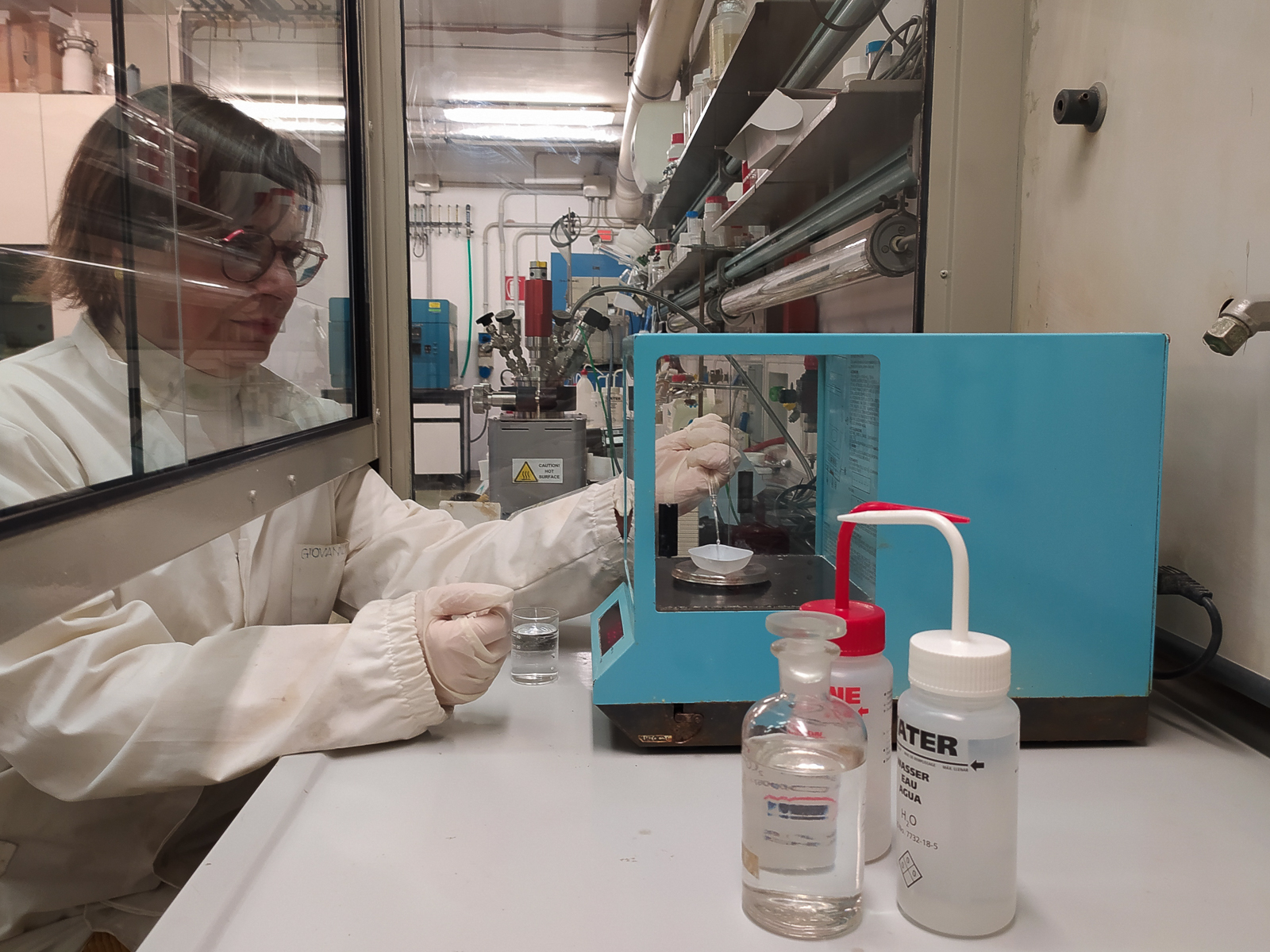
A scientist wearing gloves and a lab coat, weighing a sample under a fume hood, which protects the scientist by removing potentially harmful vapors and dusts from the laboratory

Many laboratories contain significant risks, and the prevention of laboratory accidents requires great care and constant vigilance. Examples of risk factors include high voltages, high and low pressures and temperatures, corrosive and toxic chemicals and chemical vapours, radiation, fire, explosions, and biohazards including infective organisms and their toxins.

Measures to protect against laboratory accidents include safety training and enforcement of laboratory safety policies, safety review of experimental designs, the use of personal protective equipment, and the use of the buddy system for particularly risky operations.

In many countries, laboratory work is subject to health and safety legislation. In some cases, laboratory activities can also present environmental health risks, for example, the accidental or deliberate discharge of toxic or infective material from the laboratory into the environment.

== Chemical hazards ==
Hazardous chemicals present physical and/or health threats to workers in clinical, industrial, and academic laboratories. Laboratory chemicals include cancer-causing agents (carcinogens), toxins (e.g., those affecting the liver, kidney, and nervous system), irritants, corrosives, sensitizers, as well as agents that act on the blood system or damage the lungs, skin, eyes, or mucous membranes.

== Biological hazards ==
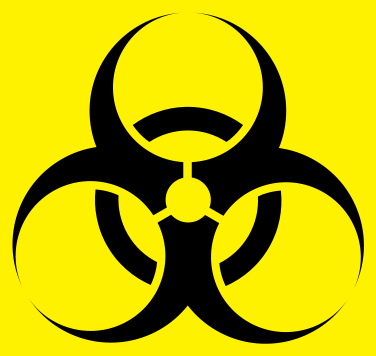
Biohazard symbol (black and yellow)

=== Biological agents and biological toxins ===
Many laboratory workers encounter daily exposure to biological hazards. These hazards are present in various sources throughout the laboratory such as blood and body fluids, culture specimens, body tissue and cadavers, and laboratory animals, as well as other workers.

These are federally regulated biological agents (e.g., viruses, bacteria, fungi, and prions) and toxins that have the potential to pose a severe threat to public health and safety, to animal or plant health, or to animal or plant products.

1. Anthrax - Anthrax is an acute infectious disease caused by a spore-forming bacterium called Bacillus anthracis.
2. Avian Flu - Avian influenza is caused by Influenza A viruses.
3. Botulism - Cases of botulism are usually associated with consumption of preserved foods.
4. Foodborne Disease - Foodborne illnesses are caused by viruses, bacteria, parasites, toxins, metals, and prions (microscopic protein particles). Symptoms range from mild gastroenteritis to life-threatening neurologic, hepatic and renal syndromes.
5. Hantavirus - Hantaviruses are transmitted to humans from the dried droppings, urine, or saliva of mice and rats.
6. Legionnaires’ Disease - Legionnaires’ disease is a bacterial disease commonly associated with water-based aerosols.
7. Molds and fungi - Molds and fungi produce and release millions of spores small enough to be air, water, or insect-borne which may have negative effects on human health including, allergic reactions, asthma, and other respiratory problems.
8. Plague - The World Health Organization reports 1,000 to 3,000 cases of plague every year. A bioterrorist release of plague could result in a rapid spread of the pneumonic form of the disease, which could have devastating consequences.
9. Ricin - Ricin is one of the most toxic and easily produced plant toxins. It has been used in the past as a bioterrorist weapon and remains a serious threat.
10. Smallpox - Smallpox is a highly contagious disease unique to humans. It is estimated that no more than 20 percent of the population has any immunity from previous vaccination.
11. Tularemia - Tularemia is also known as "rabbit fever" or "deer fly fever" and is extremely infectious. Relatively few bacteria are required to cause the disease, which is why it is an attractive weapon for use in bioterrorism.

== Physical hazards and others ==
Besides exposure to chemicals and biological agents, laboratory workers can also be exposed to a number of physical hazards. Some of the common physical hazards that they may encounter include the following: ergonomic, ionizing radiation, non-ionizing radiation, and noise hazards.

=== Ergonomic hazards ===
Laboratory workers are at risk for repetitive motion injuries during routine laboratory procedures such as pipetting, working at microscopes, operating microtomes, using cell counters, and keyboarding at computer workstations. Repetitive motion injuries develop over time and occur when muscles and joints are stressed, tendons are inflamed, nerves are pinched and the flow of blood is restricted. Standing and working in awkward positions in front of laboratory hoods/biological safety cabinets can also present ergonomic problems.

=== Ionizing radiation ===
Danger radiation zone warning sign

Ionizing radiation sources are found in a wide range of occupational settings, including laboratories. These radiation sources can pose a considerable health risk to affected workers if not properly controlled. Any laboratory possessing or using radioactive isotopes must be licensed by the Nuclear Regulatory Commission (NRC) and/or by a state agency that has been approved by the NRC, 10 CFR 31.11 and 10 CFR 35.12.

The fundamental objectives of radiation protection measures are:

- to limit entry of radionuclides into the human body (via ingestion, inhalation, absorption, or through open wounds) to quantities as low as reasonably achievable (ALARA) and always within the established limits;
- to limit exposure to external radiation to levels that are within established dose limits and as far below these limits as is reasonably achievable.

== Safety hazards ==
=== Autoclaves and sterilizers ===
Workers should be trained to recognize the potential for exposure to burns or cuts that can occur from handling or sorting hot sterilized items or sharp instruments when removing them from autoclaves/sterilizers or from steam lines that service the autoclaves.

=== Centrifuges ===
Centrifuges, due to the high speed at which they operate, have great potential for injuring users if not operated properly. Unbalanced centrifuge rotors can result in injury, even death. Sample container breakage can generate aerosols that may be harmful if inhaled. The majority of all centrifuge accidents are the result of user error.

=== Compressed gases ===
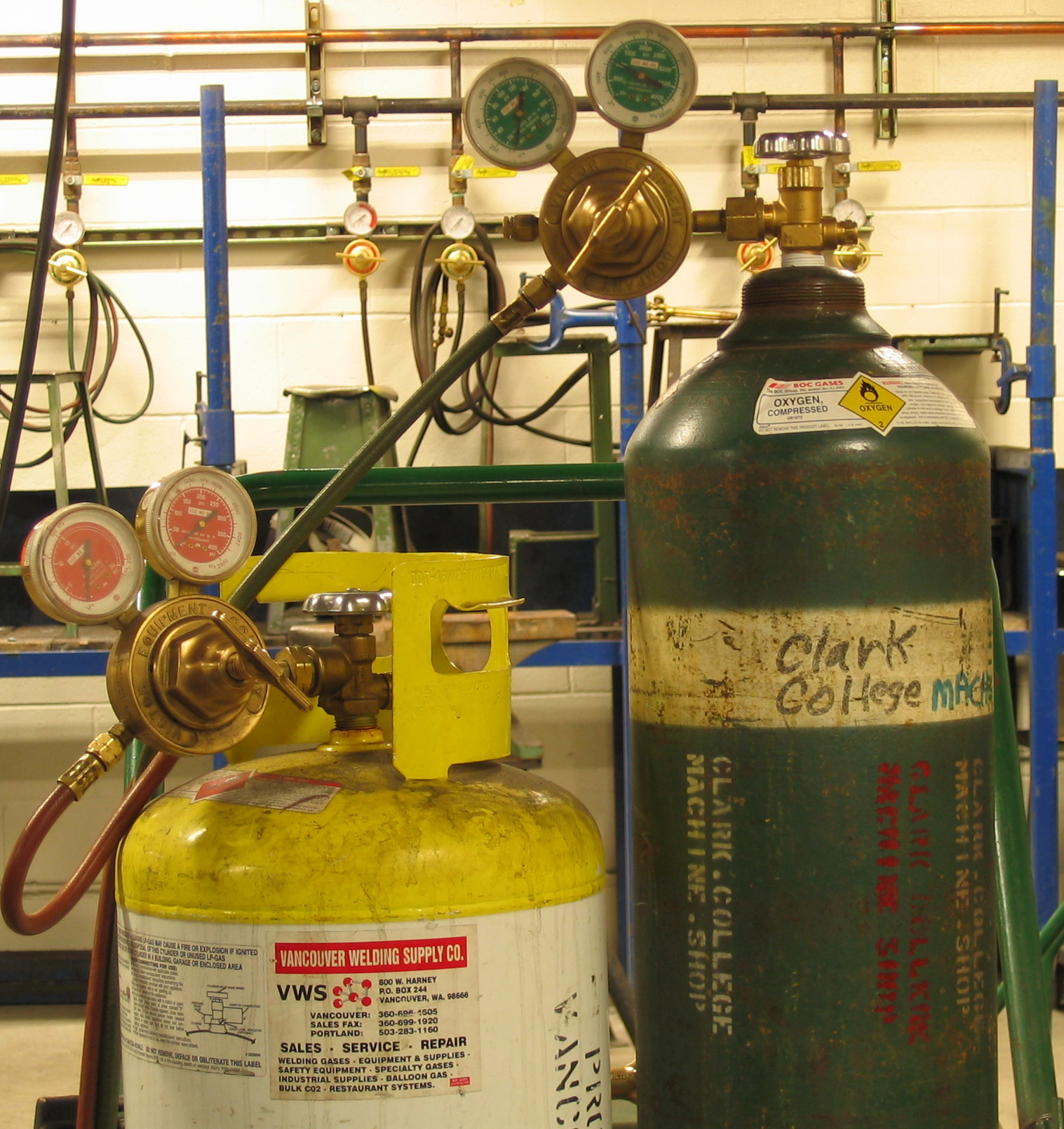
Compressed gas cylinders.mapp and oxygen.triddle

Laboratory standard for compressed gas

1. Is a gas or mixture of gases in a container having an absolute pressure exceeding 40 pounds per square inch (psi) at 70 °F (21.1 °C); or
2. Is a gas or mixture of gases having an absolute pressure exceeding 104 psi at 130 °F (54.4 °C) regardless of the pressure at 70 °F (21.1 °C); or
3. Is a liquid having a vapor pressure exceeding 40 psi at 100 °F (37.8 °C) as determined by ASTM (American Society for Testing and Materials)

Within laboratories, compressed gases are usually supplied either through fixed piped gas systems or individual cylinders of gases. Compressed gases can be toxic, flammable, oxidizing, corrosive, or inert. Leakage of any of these gases can be hazardous.

==== Store, handle, and use compressed gases ====
- All cylinders whether empty or full must be stored upright.
- Secure cylinders of compressed gases. Cylinders should never be dropped or allowed to strike each other with force.
- Transport compressed gas cylinders with protective caps in place and do not roll or drag the cylinders.

=== Cryogens and dry ice ===
Cryogens, substances used to produce very low temperatures [below -153 °C (-243 °F)], such as liquid nitrogen (LN_{2}) which has a boiling point of -196 °C (-321 °F), are commonly used in laboratories.

Although not a cryogen, solid carbon dioxide or dry ice which converts directly to carbon dioxide gas at -78 °C (-109 °F) is also often used in laboratories. Shipments packed with dry ice, samples preserved with liquid nitrogen, and in some cases, techniques that use cryogenic liquids, such as cryogenic grinding of samples, present potential hazards in the laboratory.

Hand protection is required to guard against the hazard of touching cold surfaces. It is recommended that Cryogen Safety Gloves be used by the worker.

Eye protection is required at all times when working with cryogenic fluids. When pouring a cryogen, working with a wide-mouth Dewar flask, or around the exhaust of cold boil-off gas, use of a full face shield is recommended.

=== Personal protective equipments ===
Personal protective equipment or PPE is equipment worn to protect against exposure to hazardous substances. PPE does not eliminate the risks of hazards, as it only helps protect the user from exposure. To ensure safety, workplaces provide instructions and training on how to use and choose proper PPE in different situations.

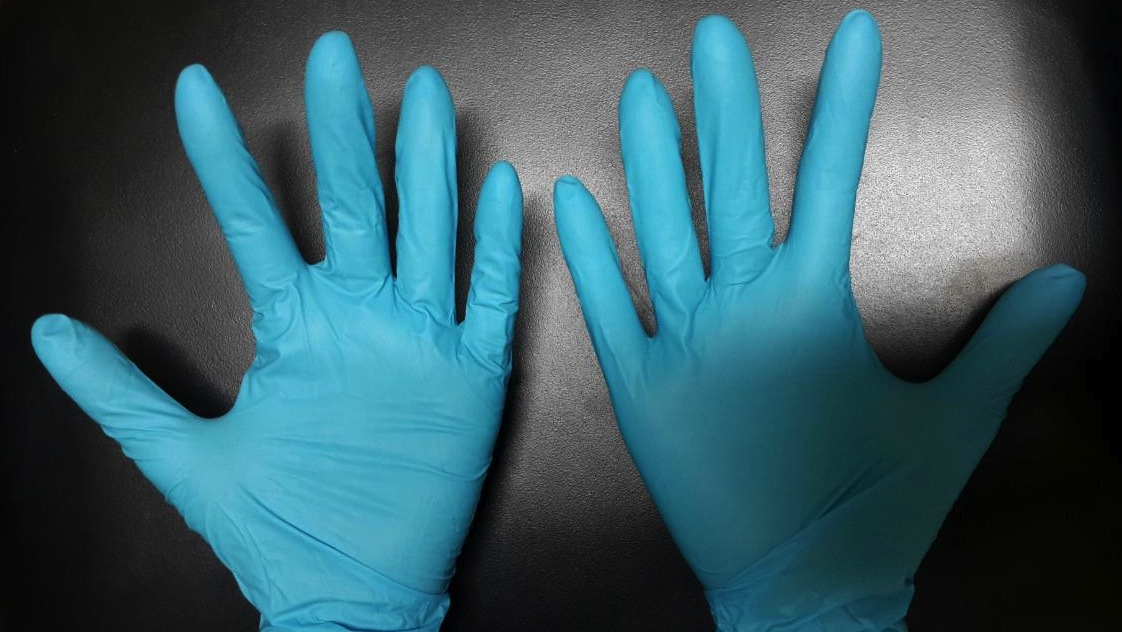
Nitrile gloves

PPE includes:

- Long-sleeved shirts, lab coats, aprons
- Goggles
- Safety gloves;
  - The two most common types of safety gloves are latex and nitrile gloves. Latex gloves have a high sensitivity when it comes to contact and fine control which is very suitable for surgery. Nitrile gloves are generally more durable and resistant to tearing and chemicals. However, the sulfur in some nitrile gloves can oxidize silver and other highly reactive metals.
- Face shield or mask
- Particulate respirator
- Organic vapor respirator

=== Electrical ===
In the laboratory, there is the potential for workers to be exposed to electrical hazards including electric shock, electrocutions, fires, and explosions. Damaged electrical cords can lead to possible shocks or electrocutions. A flexible electrical cord may be damaged by door or window edges, by staples and fastenings, by equipment rolling over it, or simply by aging.

The potential for possible electrocution or electric shock or contact with electrical hazards can result from a number of factors, including the following:

- Faulty electrical equipment/instrumentation or wiring;
- Damaged receptacles and connectors; and
- Unsafe work practices.

=== Fire ===
Fire

Fire is the most common serious hazard that one faces in a typical laboratory. While proper procedures and training can minimize the chances of an accidental fire, laboratory workers should still be prepared to deal with a fire emergency should it occur. In dealing with a laboratory fire, all containers of infectious materials should be placed into autoclaves, incubators, refrigerators, or freezers for containment.

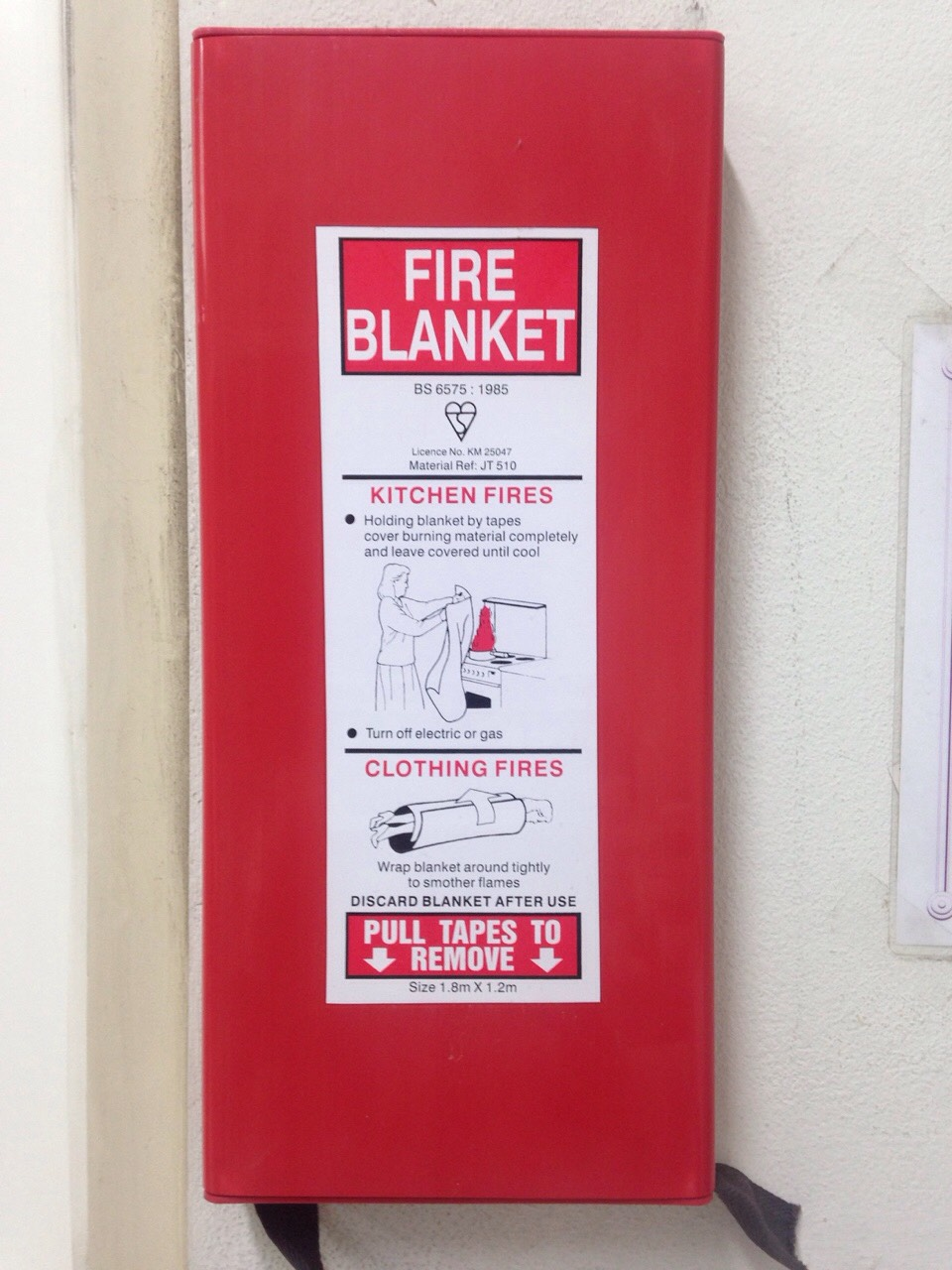
Fire blanket

Small bench-top fires in laboratory spaces are not uncommon. Large laboratory fires are rare. However, the risk of severe injury or death is significant because fuel load and hazard levels in labs are typically very high. Laboratories, especially those using solvents in any quantity, have the potential for flash fires, explosions, rapid spread of fire, and high toxicity of products of combustion (heat, smoke, and flame)

=== Glassware ===
- Broken glass is a hazard for a sharps
- Correct eye protection should be worn in most experiments involving glassware.
- Inserting a glass rod through a stopper can introduce the possibility of a stab wound or sharps injury if the rod breaks. The hands must be protected.
- Tubing should be cut from a barbed connection so as not to shatter the connection. A quick disconnect is preferable to a barbed fitting.
- Ground glass joints can become a breaking hazard if they freeze.
- Broken and other waste glass should be discarded in a separate container specially marked to indicate its contents.
- Glassware should always be labeled as to its contents.

External videos
- An account of beakers exposed to high temperatures, introducing new internal stresses, and heedlessly mixing them back to the collection without annealing, creating the risk that was deemed too high for reasons of safety and of potentially ruining projects.
- I had to break all my beakers., NileBlue, Jan 2020.

- Rapid heating (or cooling) may cause uneven thermal expansion putting too much mechanical stress on the surface and cause it to fracture. Fracturing is a concern when people new to laboratory become impatient and heat glassware, especially the larger pieces, too fast. Heating of glassware should be slowed using an insulating material, such as metal foil or wool, or specialized equipment such as heated baths, heating mantles or laboratory grade hot plates to avoid fracturing.
- Hot glass looks like cold glass, so a person must be careful to avoid grabbing hot glassware.
- Glassware can explode if the exhaust is in any way restricted, so any apparatus should be vented.
- Glassware can implode under negative pressure
- When connecting joints, it is the responsibility of the person overseeing the experiment to select the correct seal. For example, PTFE tape, bands, and fluoroether-based grease or oils may emit toxic perfluoroisobutylene fumes if the rated temperature limits are exceed.
