= Greg Boyle =

American Jesuit priest (born 1954)

The Reverend Greg Boyle SJ
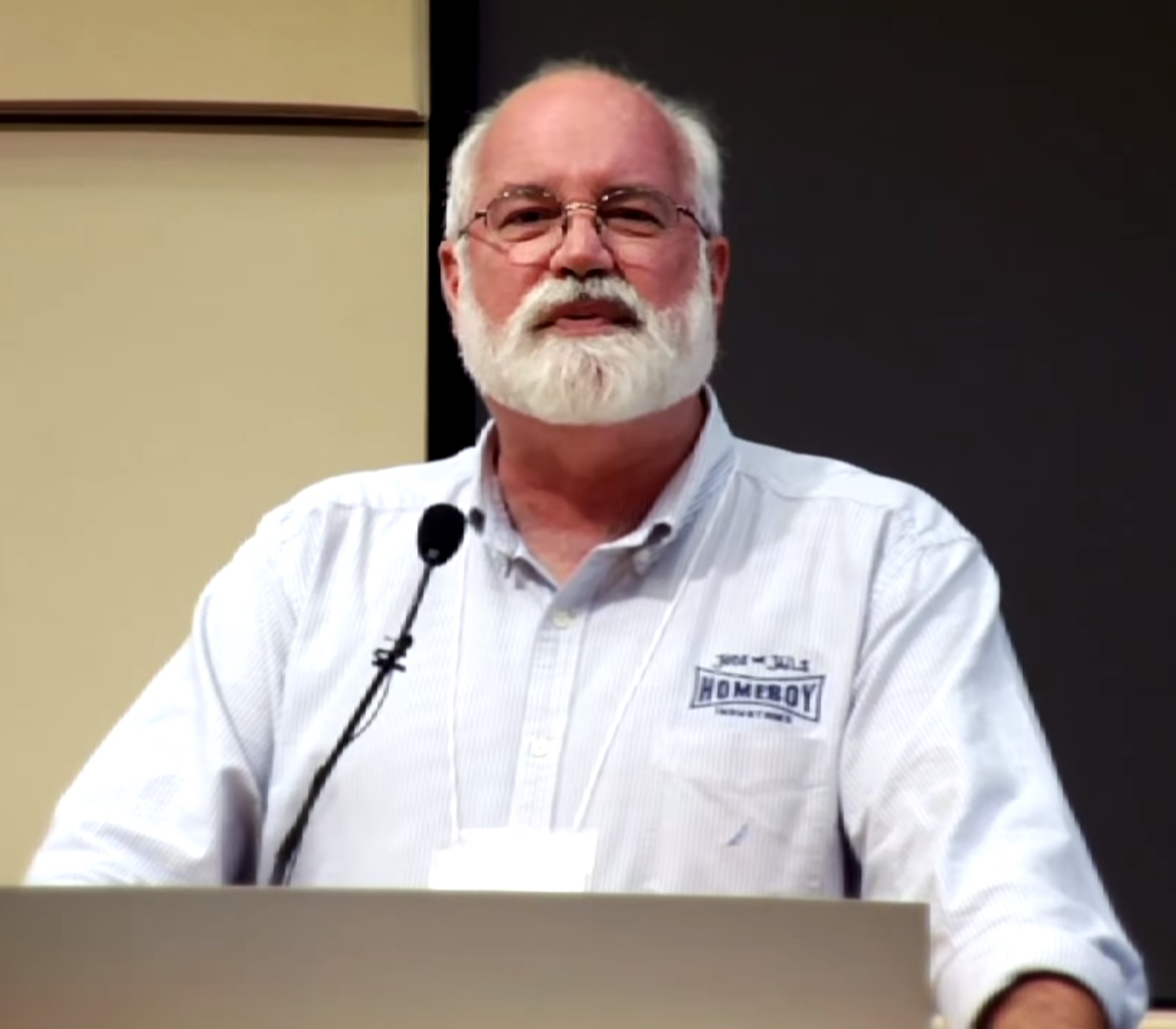
- Boyle speaks at the Durfee Foundation in 2011
- Born: Gregory Joseph Boyle; May 19, 1954 (age 72); Los Angeles, California, U.S.
- Education: BA, Gonzaga University; MA, Loyola Marymount University; M.Div., Weston School of Theology; S.T.M., Jesuit School of Theology
- Occupation: Priest
- Awards: Presidential Medal of Freedom (2024)

Gregory Joseph Boyle (born May 19, 1954) is an American Jesuit priest who is the founder and director of Homeboy Industries, the world's largest gang intervention and rehabilitation program. He is the former pastor of Dolores Mission Church in Los Angeles.

== Early life and education ==
Boyle was born in Los Angeles, and is one of eight siblings born to Kathleen and Bernie Boyle. He attended Loyola High School and, upon graduating in 1972, entered the Society of Jesus (the Jesuits). Boyle was ordained a priest in 1984.

He holds a bachelor's degree in philosophy and English from Gonzaga University in Spokane, Washington, a master's degree in English from Loyola Marymount University in Los Angeles, a Master of Divinity (M.Div.) degree from the Weston School of Theology, Cambridge, Massachusetts, and a Master of Sacred Theology degree from the Jesuit School of Theology, Berkeley, California.

== Early career ==
At the conclusion of his theology studies, Boyle spent a year living and working with Christian base communities in Cochabamba, Bolivia. Upon his return in 1986, he was appointed pastor of Dolores Mission Church, a Jesuit parish in the Boyle Heights neighborhood of East Los Angeles that was then the poorest Catholic church in the city. At the time, the church sat between two large public housing projects and amid the territories of eight gangs. Referred to as the "decade of death" in Los Angeles between 1988 and 1998, there were close to a thousand people per year killed in Los Angeles from gang related crime.

== Homeboy Industries ==
By 1988, in an effort to address the escalating problems and unmet needs of gang-involved youth, Boyle, alongside parish and community members, began to develop positive opportunities for them, including establishing an alternative school and a day care program, and seeking out legitimate employment, calling this initial effort Jobs for a Future.

In the wake of the 1992 Los Angeles riots, Jobs for a Future and Proyecto Pastoral, a community organizing project begun at the parish, launched their first social enterprise business, Homeboy Bakery. Initial funding for the bakery was donated by the late film producer Ray Stark. In the ensuing years, the success of the bakery created the groundwork for additional social enterprise businesses, leading Jobs for a Future to become an independent nonprofit organization, Homeboy Industries.

Homeboy Industries is the largest gang rehabilitation and re-entry program in the world. Homeboy offers an "exit ramp" for those stuck in a cycle of violence and incarceration. The organization's holistic approach, with free services and programs, supports around 10,000 men and women a year as they work to overcome their pasts, re-imagine their futures, and break the inter-generational cycles of gang violence. Therapeutic and educational offerings (e.g., case management, counseling, and classes), practical services (e.g., tattoo removal, work readiness, and legal assistance), and job training-focused business (e.g., Homeboy Bakery, Homegirl Café, and Homeboy Silkscreen & Embroidery) provide alternatives to gang life while creating safer and healthier communities.

== Board membership ==
Boyle serves as a member of the National Gang Center Advisory Board. He is also a member of the advisory board for the Loyola Law School Center for Juvenile Law and Policy in Los Angeles.

== Published works ==
- Father Greg & the Homeboys: The Extraordinary Journey of Father Greg Boyle and His Work With the Latino Gangs of East L.A., 1995, Hyperion Books, 978–0786860890
- Tattoos on the Heart: The Power of Boundless Compassion, 2010, Free Press, 978–1439153024
- Barking to the Choir: The Power of Radical Kinship, 2017, Simon & Schuster, 978–1476726151
- Creating a Culture of Tenderness: Embracing Our Kinship with All of Life, 2019, Sounds True Inc, 978–1683643326
- The Whole Language: The Power of Extravagant Tenderness, 2021, Avid Reader Press / Simon & Schuster, 978–1982128326
- Forgive Everyone Everything, 2022, Loyola Press, 978–0829450248
- Cherished Belonging: The Healing Power of Love in Divided Times, 2024, Simon & Schuster, 978–1668061855

== Awards ==
Boyle has received the Civic Medal of Honor from the Los Angeles Area Chamber of Commerce, the California Peace Prize granted by the California Wellness Foundation, the Lifetime Achievement Award from MALDEF, and the James Irvine Foundation’s Leadership Award.

Boyle was named the 2007 Humanitarian of the Year by Bon Appetit magazine.

Boyle was inducted into the California Hall of Fame in December 2011.

In 2014, Boyle was awarded the honorary Doctor of Humane Letters (L.H.D.) from Whittier College.

He was named the 2016 Humanitarian of the Year by the James Beard Foundation, a national culinary-arts organization.

Boyle was selected to receive the Laetare Medal in recognition of outstanding service to the Catholic Church and society in March 2017.

In 2024, he received the Presidential Medal of Freedom for his work.
