= Homeboy Industries =

US nonprofit organization

Coordinates: 34°3′44.27″N 118°14′8.44″W

- Established: 1992; 34 years ago
- Location(s): Alameda & Bruno Streets; Los Angeles, California
- Founder: Greg Boyle, S.J.
- Capacity: 200–235 youth
- Affiliations: Jesuit, Catholic
- Budget: $14.7 million
- Website: homeboyindustries.org
- Formerly called: Jobs for a Future

Homeboy Industries is a youth program founded in 1992 by Father Greg Boyle following the work of the Christian base communities at Dolores Mission Church in Boyle Heights, Los Angeles. The program is intended to assist high-risk youth, former gang members and the recently incarcerated with a variety of free programs, such as mental health counseling, legal services, tattoo removal, curriculum and education classes, work-readiness training, and employment services.

== History ==
Homeboy Industries began in 1988 as a job training program (called Jobs for a Future) out of Dolores Mission Parish in Boyle Heights, Los Angeles, California. It was created by then-pastor Greg Boyle to offer an alternative to gang life for high-risk youth, who were living in a city with the highest concentration of gang activity in the country. In those early days, Boyle found sympathetic businesses that agreed to hire recovering gang members.

In 1992, an abandoned warehouse was converted into the first business, Homeboy Bakery, to create more opportunities for employment. The Bakery started off producing tortillas and eventually received a contract for baking bread. Eventually more businesses were added, and in 2001, Homeboy Industries became an independent non-profit. "Nothing stops a bullet like a job" is the guiding principle.

Dolores Mission Alternative School was created to offer high school drop outs a chance for a diploma. In 2010, Learning Works became the new high school. There are currently 75 students enrolled, and in 2012 enrollment is expected to reach 105.

In October 2007, Homeboy Industries opened a new $8.5 million headquarters at the Fran and Ray Stark building, in a gang-neutral downtown location.

In addition to jobs, Homeboy Industries offers training in anger management, domestic violence, yoga, spiritual development, parenting, substance abuse, budgeting, art and other areas of self-development. In addition, they offer free mental health counseling, tattoo removal, legal services, job development and case management.

One of Homeboy's most successful programs is free tattoo removal. Young people who find that tattoos inhibit their ability to secure employment can receive treatments on site at Homeboy's center in Downtown Los Angeles, California, USA. Though tattoo removal by laser is known to be painful and takes an average of eight to ten treatments per tattoo, and in some cases up to one year to complete, patient retention is virtually 100%. The clinic completes about 560 treatments per month. According to the Los Angeles Times, in 2018, Homeboy removed 43,777 tattoos from former gang members trying to turn their lives around.

Homeboy Industries faced financial difficulties in 2010, but the organization has reached a strong point in 2011 and is seeing more clients than ever before. New developments in 2010 and 2011 included the launch of Homeboy Tortilla Strips and Salsa in Ralphs stores across California, and the expansion of the Homeboy social enterprises with the Homeboy Diner at City Hall and Homeboy Farmers Markets. Boyle's memoir, Tattoos on the Heart: The Power of Boundless Compassion, was released in 2010.

Homeboy currently employs between 200 and 235 high-risk, formerly gang-involved, and recently incarcerated youth in its six social enterprises and headquarters, though the free services (from tattoo removal to Baby and Me class) are utilized by more than 10,000 community members a year.

In 2014, the Global Homeboy Network was founded to work with other organizations to provide similar programs and the social enterprise employment structure across the globe. Father Greg hopes organizations will not duplicate Homeboy Industries, but seek to creating a community and a place of welcome to those in trouble.

According to its annual budget, Homeboy Industries receives government support from the Department of Labor and the City of L.A.'s Gang Reduction Youth Development program. The nonprofit also receives donations from corporations and individuals to fund trainee compensation, programs, fundraising, administration and businesses. The annual budget is around $14.7 million, where 25% of the revenue is utilized to sustain all the free services and programs for young adults who have recently left prison.

== Enterprises ==
A distinctive aspect of Homeboy Industries is its structure of a multifaceted social enterprise and social business. This helps young people who were former gang members and former inmates to have an opportunity to acquire job skills and seek employment in a safe, supportive environment.

As of July 28, 2025, Homeboy has around 13 business lines. Among the businesses are the Homeboy Bakery, Homegirl Café & Catering, Homeboy/Girl Merchandise, Homeboy Farmers Markets, The Homeboy Diner at City Hall, Homeboy Silkscreen & Embroidery, Homeboy Grocery, and Homeboy Cafe & Bakery in the American Airlines terminal at Los Angeles International Airport.

=== Homeboy Grocery ===
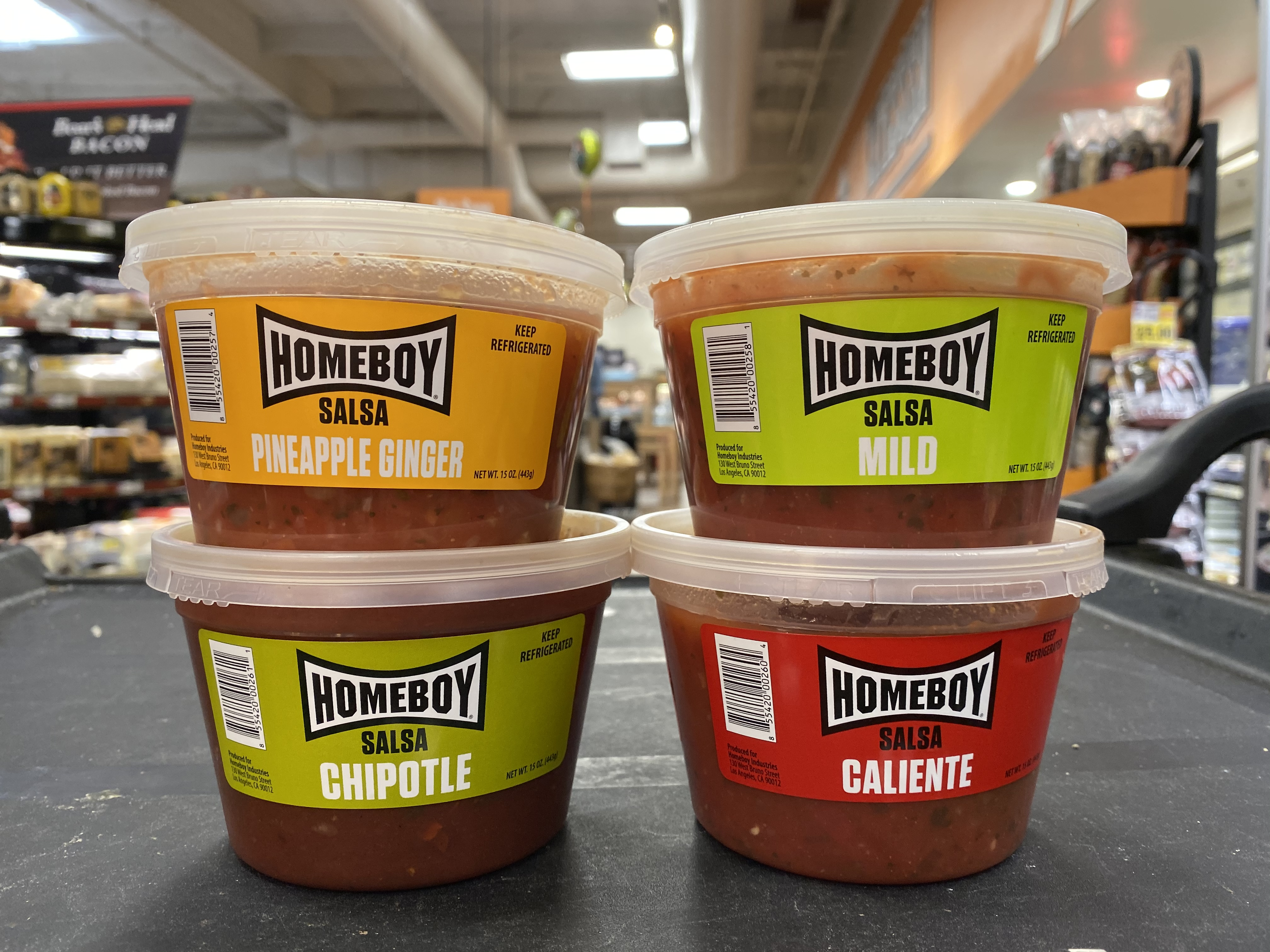
Four different flavors of Homeboy salsas at Ralphs Supermarket

The growing number of ex-gang members and prisoners had quickly outnumbered the amount of available jobs at Homeboy Industries. According to Boyle, Homeboy Industries laid off approximately 330 employees in 2010, including senior staff and administrators. Homeboy Industries failed to generate its $5 million needed to operate. In order to rehabilitate their finances, Homeboy Industries created "Homeboy Groceries" in January 2011, consisting of foods such as chips, salsa, and guacamole.

Because of Homeboy's new partnerships and job opportunities that Homeboy Grocery has provided, Homeboy Industries is continuing to operate.

The salsas are based on Homegirl Café's Chef Patricia "Pati" Zarate's recipes, but actually are made by El Burrito Food Products Inc., based in the City of Industry. The chips, on the other hand, are made by Snak King, also based in City of Industry. Homeboy receives a part of the sales in an agreement with the manufacturers, the distributor and Ralphs, and all of the proceeds go to funding Homeboy services such as tattoo removal and counseling. Royalties from Homeboy Grocery sales exceeded $1.1 million annually. Most recently, on 13 June 2019, Homeboy Industries celebrated the introduction of Homeboy Salsa and Homeboy Guacamole in forty different Southern California Walmart stores. This celebration took place in the Compton chain, featuring Compton's Mayor, Aja Brown, as well as Walmart's Senior Director of Community Relations, Javier Angulo.

Homeboy Groceries goods are currently available in the DELI section at Ralphs, Gelson's, Walmart, and Stop & Shop.

== Recognition and awards ==
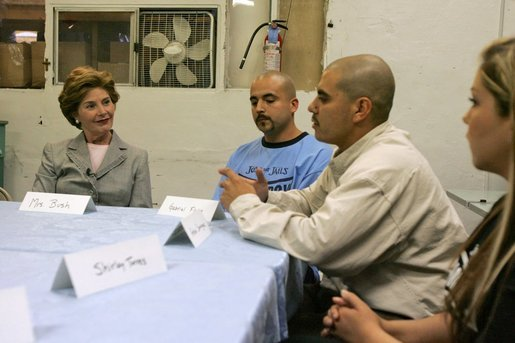
Former First Lady Laura Bush meets staff and employees at a bakery run by Homeboy Industries on 27 April 2005.

Although Boyle and Homeboy Industries have been criticized by the LAPD for glorifying gang life and harboring criminals, the organization has received recognition and praise from other law enforcement agency and government officials in LA. These include the Los Angeles County Sheriff Lee Baca, LAPD Chief Charlie Beck, and Los Angeles Mayor Antonio Villaraigosa. In 2005, former First Lady Laura Bush visited a bakery run by Homeboy Industries to see how it was helping young people involved in gangs.

In 2007, an independent documentary titled Father G. and the Homeboys was released about the organization and what it did for ex-gang members.

Homeboy Industries made its first foray into the mainstream market with its salsa being sold at Ralphs Supermarket.

In 2007, Boyle appeared in an episode of MTV's True Life, which followed an employee of Homeboy Industries named Dennis.

Boyle and Homeboy Industries were awarded in the humanitarian category by of the 10th Annual Bon Appétit Awards in September 2007.

Members of Homeboy Industries were also shown in the music video for Daughtry's "What About Now" in July 2008.

For his work with Homeboy Industries, Boyle received the 2008 James Irvine Foundation Leadership Award".

Boyle was inducted into the California Hall of Fame in December 2011.

Boyle was named the 2016 Humanitarian of the Year by the James Beard Foundation, a national culinary-arts organization.

The 2017 Laetare Medal, a prestigious annual award given by the University of Notre Dame to an American Catholic, was awarded to Boyle.

Homeboy's 2019 "Lo Maximo" award ceremony was hosted by actresses Jane Fonda and Lily Tomlin and celebrated notable allies of Homeboy Industries, including former California Governor Jerry Brown, who was presented with the 2019 "Kinship Award".

== See also ==
- Homeboyz Interactive, a similar program in Milwaukee that followed.
