= Optical Museum Jena =

Museum in Jena, Germany

Coordinates: 50°55′40″N 11°34′45″E

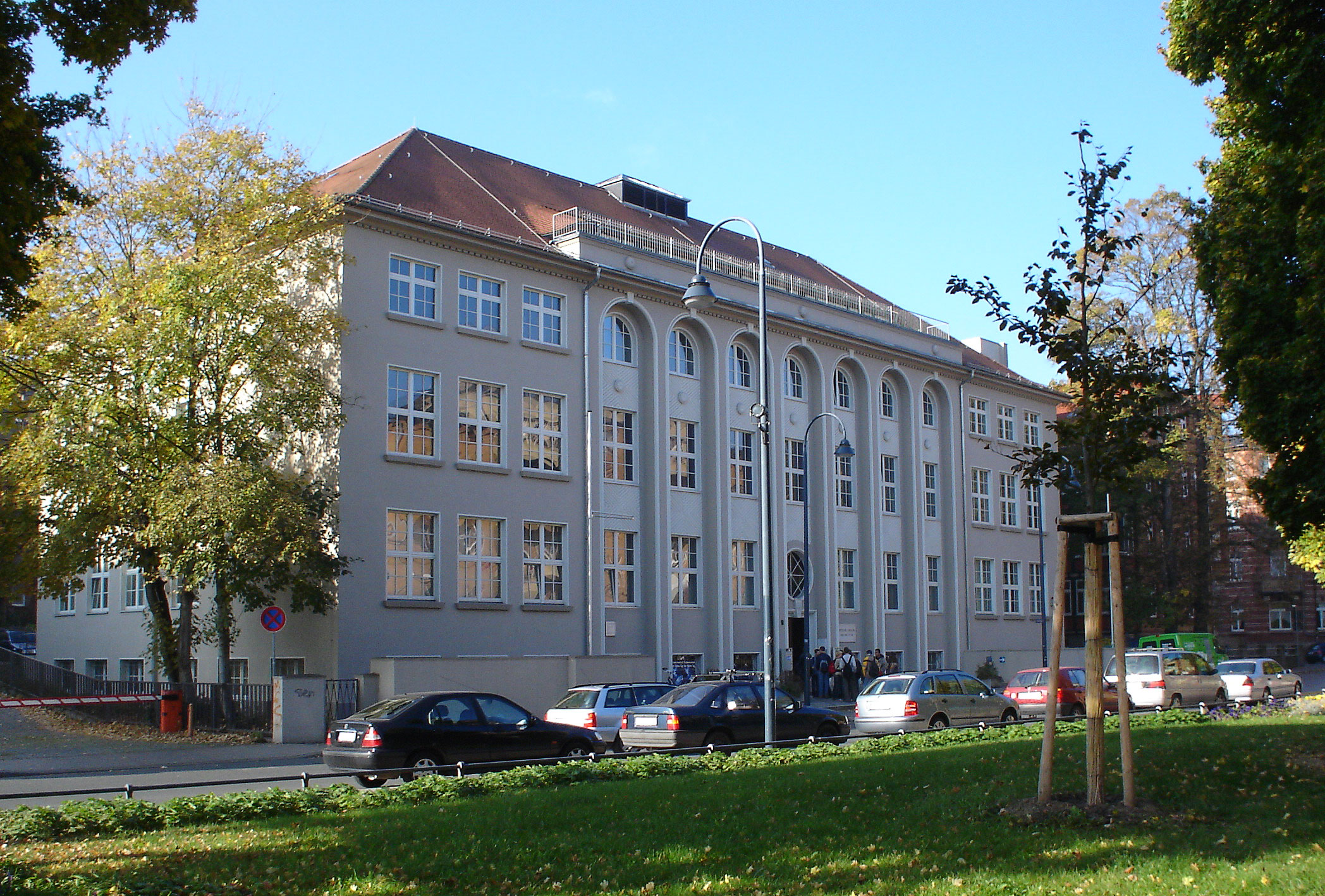
Optical Museum Jena

Optical Museum Jena, Thuringia

The Deutsches Optisches Museum Jena is a science and technology museum displaying optical instruments from eight centuries. It gives a technical and cultural-historical survey of the development of optical instruments. The development of the city Jena to the centre of the optical industries since the mid-19th-century is integrated in the exhibition, connected with the lifeworks of Ernst Abbe, Carl Zeiss and Otto Schott. In cooperation with the art club Jena non-optical themes are offered in special exhibitions. Before the opening of the Zeiss Museum of Optics in Oberkochen in 2014, the Deutsches Optisches Museum Jena was the only museum of its kind in Germany.

== History ==
Besides the production of microscopes, Carl Zeiss took over repairing optical instruments of other manufacturers. He did this to pursue the rivalries development. At the turn from 19th to the 20th century, the staff of the Carl Zeiss company began to collect optical instruments.

In June 1922, the Carl-Zeiss-Stiftung established the Optical Museum; the exhibition was located in the neighbouring Volkshaus (community hall). Johannes Schreiter and Hans Schlag designed a building for the 1917 founded "college of ophthalmology". The reinforced concrete construction was carried out during 1923/24 by the company Dyckerhoff & Widmann (DYWIDAG) from Nuremberg. In October 1924, the exhibition was moved into the new building at no. 12 Carl-Zeiss-Platz in which it is still housed today. The collections were reserved for a selected group of people for purposes of research and not open to the public.

During the Second World War in 1941/42, the exhibition was relocated to underground production facilities around Jena. The Optical Museum was preserved from the Soviet occupation's dismantling programme 1946. The first permanent exhibition was launched 1965 in the Griesbach Garden House. In 1976/77, the exhibition was returned to the building at no. 12 Carl-Zeiss-Platz. On the occasion of the 100th anniversary of the death of Carl Zeiss in December 1988, the historical Zeiss-Workshop (circa 1860) was opened as part of the Optical Museum in the neighboured Volkshaus.

Accompanied with the opening, the museum was renamed as the "Zeiss-Museum" but the name was changed back in 1991. In June 1992, the Optical Museum was taken into the trusteeship of the newly established Ernst-Abbe-Foundation. The historical Zeiss-Workshop was moved in 2002 from the Volkshaus to the Optical Museum.

The Carl Zeiss Foundation, the Ernst Abbe Foundation, Carl Zeiss AG, the city of Jena and the Friedrich Schiller University in Jena joined forces to establish the Deutsches Optisches Museum Foundation on 9 September 2016. The Foundation has been tasked with expanding the existing Optical Museum and turning it into the Deutsches Optisches Museum.

== Show-Rooms ==
The present exhibition covers an area of 1200 m^{2} at three floors:

=== Ground ===
- History of glasses
- Historical development of microscopy
- Telescopes and their masters
- History of photography
- World of images: camera obscura, peep shows and magic lanterns
- Ophthalmological instruments
- Carl Zeiss: life and work
- Ernst Abbe
- Otto Schott

=== Basement ===
- Historical Zeiss-Workshop 1860
- Holograph-collection
- Colors
- Milestones of optics (optical lab for classes)

=== Upper floor ===
- Planetarium equipment
- Special exhibition
- Lecture hall
