= Marchetti dilatometer test =

Marchetti dilatometer test or flat dilatometer, is a type of dilatometer commonly designated by DMT.

It was created by Silvano Marchetti (1980) and is one of the most versatile tools for soil characterization, namely loose to medium compacted granular soils and soft to medium clays, or even stiffer if a good reaction system is provided. The main reasons for its usefulness deriving geotechnical parameters are related to the simplicity and the speed of execution, generating continuous data profiles of high accuracy and reproducibility.
