= Frank Heinricht =

German physicist

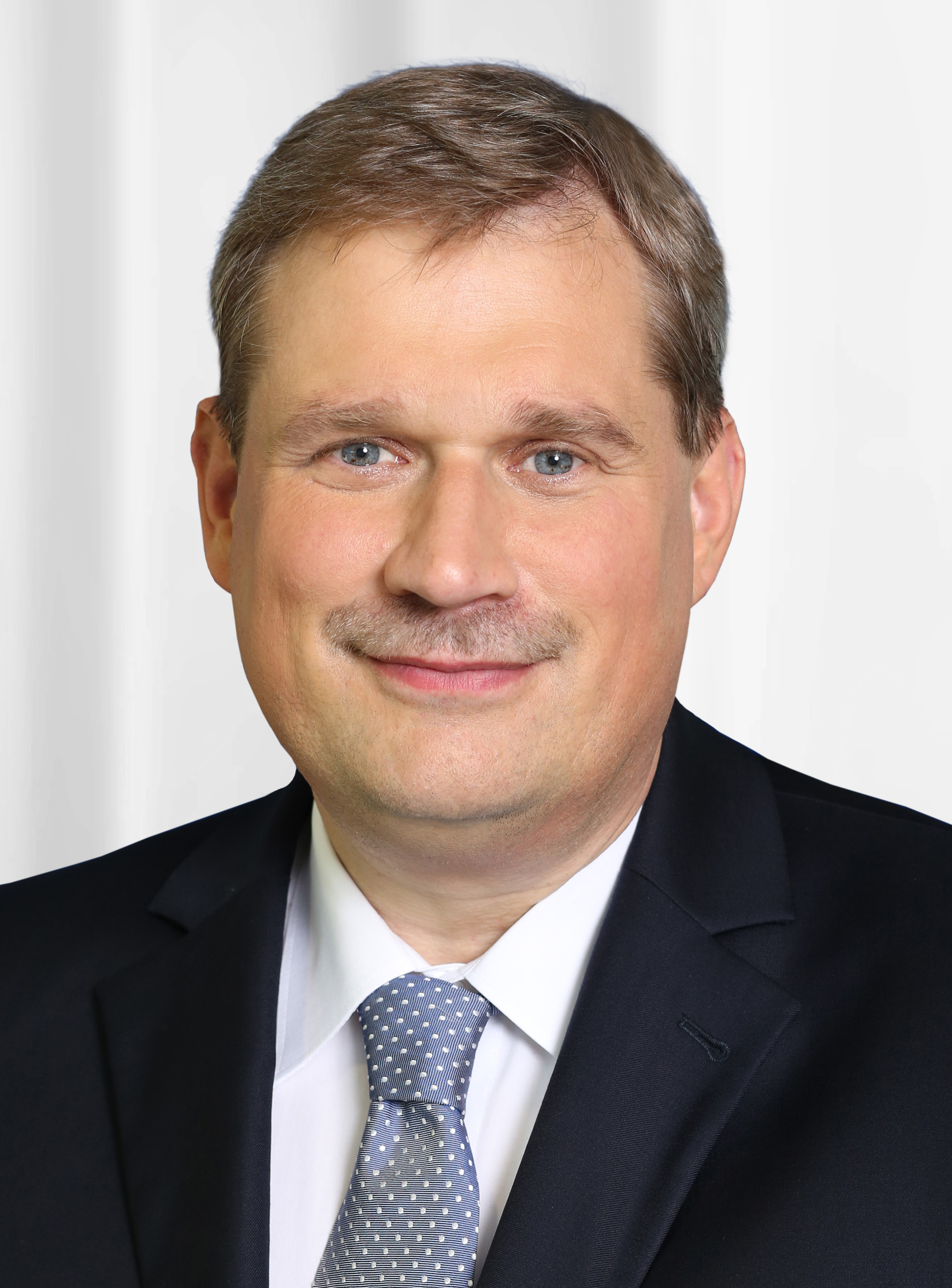
- Frank Heinricht (2013)
- Born: 2 March 1962 (age 64); Berlin, Germany
- Education: Technische Universität Berlin

Frank Heinricht (born March 2, 1962, in Berlin) is a German physicist with a doctorate in engineering. He has been Chairman of the Board of Management of Schott AG in Mainz from 2013 to 2024.

== Life and education ==
After completing a degree in physics and a doctorate in engineering at Technische Universität Berlin, he entered the professional world in 1992.

== Professional activities ==
His first professional position was at Temic Semiconductors in Heilbronn, where he was appointed General Manager and Chairman of the Integrated Circuits division in 1995. Following its dissolution in 1998, the company was divided into three independent entities. The one in which Heinricht was now Chief Executive Officer of the Integrated Circuits division was acquired by Atmel Corporation.

Heinricht accepted a management role at Heraeus Holding GmbH in Hanau in 2003. He became Chairman of Heraeus in 2008. His responsibilities included Research and Development.

The Supervisory Board of Schott AG appointed Heinricht Chairman of the Board of Management in February 2013 with effect from June 1 of that year. With the Mainz-based technology group in the midst of withdrawing from the solar industry starting in 2012, Heinricht fortified the core areas of pharmaceutical packaging, CERAN cooktop panels, fire viewing panels and fire-resistant glass alongside components for protecting sensitive electronics. Fiscal year 2016 under Heinricht saw a 47% increase in annual profit to EUR 139 million. Sales reached EUR 1.99 billion. In the fiscal year 2018/2019, the sales of Schott AG reached 2,2 billion Euro.

== Other involvement ==
Heinricht has been President of the Federal Association of the German Glass Industry (BV Glas) since November 2015 and is a member of the Presidential Board of the Federation of German Industries (BDI) for 2017 and 2018. He is also Vice Chairman of the Supervisory Board of the Würth Group and Chairman of the Supervisory Board of Sennheiser electronic GmbH & Co. KG. In 2012, the German Materials Society e.V. (DGM) appointed Heinricht an honorary member for life after his more than six years on the board, two of which on the Financial Advisory Board and two as Chairman.
