= Sony α Carl Zeiss Vario-Sonnar T* 24-70mm f/2.8 ZA SSM =

Carl Zeiss Vario-Sonnar T* 24-70mm f/2.8 ZA SSM
- Maker: Sony, Carl Zeiss

Technical data
- Type: Zoom
- Focal length: 24-70mm
- Aperture (max/min): f/2.8
- Close focus distance: 0.34m
- Max. magnification: 0.25×
- Diaphragm blades: 9 circular
- Construction: 17 elements in 13 groups

Features
- Ultrasonic motor: Yes Yes
- Lens-based stabilization: Yes Yes
- Unique features: Carl Zeiss approved

Physical
- Max. length: 142 mm
- Diameter: 83 mm
- Weight: 955g
- Filter diameter: 77mm

Accessories
- Lens hood: Composite Metal-plastic bayonet-mounted flower

History
- Introduction: 2008

Retail info
- MSRP: $2000 USD

The Vario-Sonnar T* 24–70 mm f/2.8 ZA SSM (SAL-2470Z) is a high-quality zoom lens compatible with cameras using the Sony α, and Minolta AF lens mounts. It was designed and is manufactured by Sony in Japan in collaboration with Carl Zeiss.

== See also ==
- Zeiss Vario-Sonnar
