= Schott Pharma =

Company carved out from Schott AG in 2022, stock listed in SDAX

Schott Pharma AG & Co. KGaA
- Type: KGaA with Aktiengesellschaft as partner with unlimited liability
- Traded as: FWB: 1SXP
- ISIN: DE000A3ENQ51
- Industry: Healthcare
- Founded: August 1, 2022; 4 years ago
- Headquarters: Mainz, Germany
- Key people: Christian Mias, CEO; Reinhard Mayer, CFO
- Products: Pharmaceutical drug containment and delivery systems
- Revenue: ▲€986 million (2024/2025)
- Owner: Schott AG
- Number of employees: 4,811 (as of September 30, 2025)
- Divisions: Drug Containment Solutions; Drug Delivery Systems
- Website: schott-pharma.com

Schott Pharma (stylized as SCHOTT Pharma) is a provider of drug containment solutions and delivery systems for injectable drugs. Originally a division of glass manufacturer Schott AG, the company went public on the Frankfurt Stock Exchange in 2023. Headquartered in Mainz, Germany, the company operates in 14 countries.

== History ==
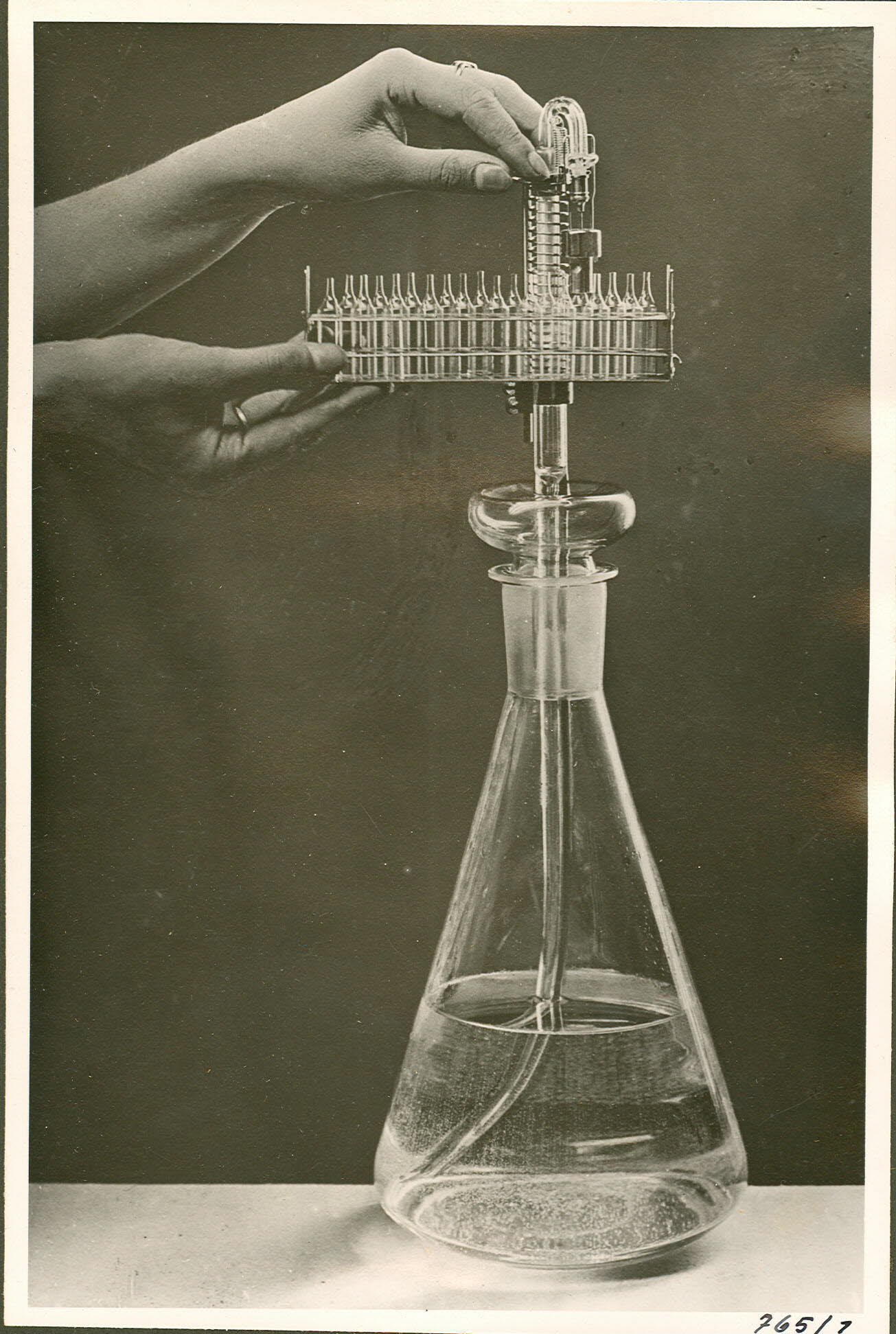
Filling Schott glass ampoules with medications (1932)

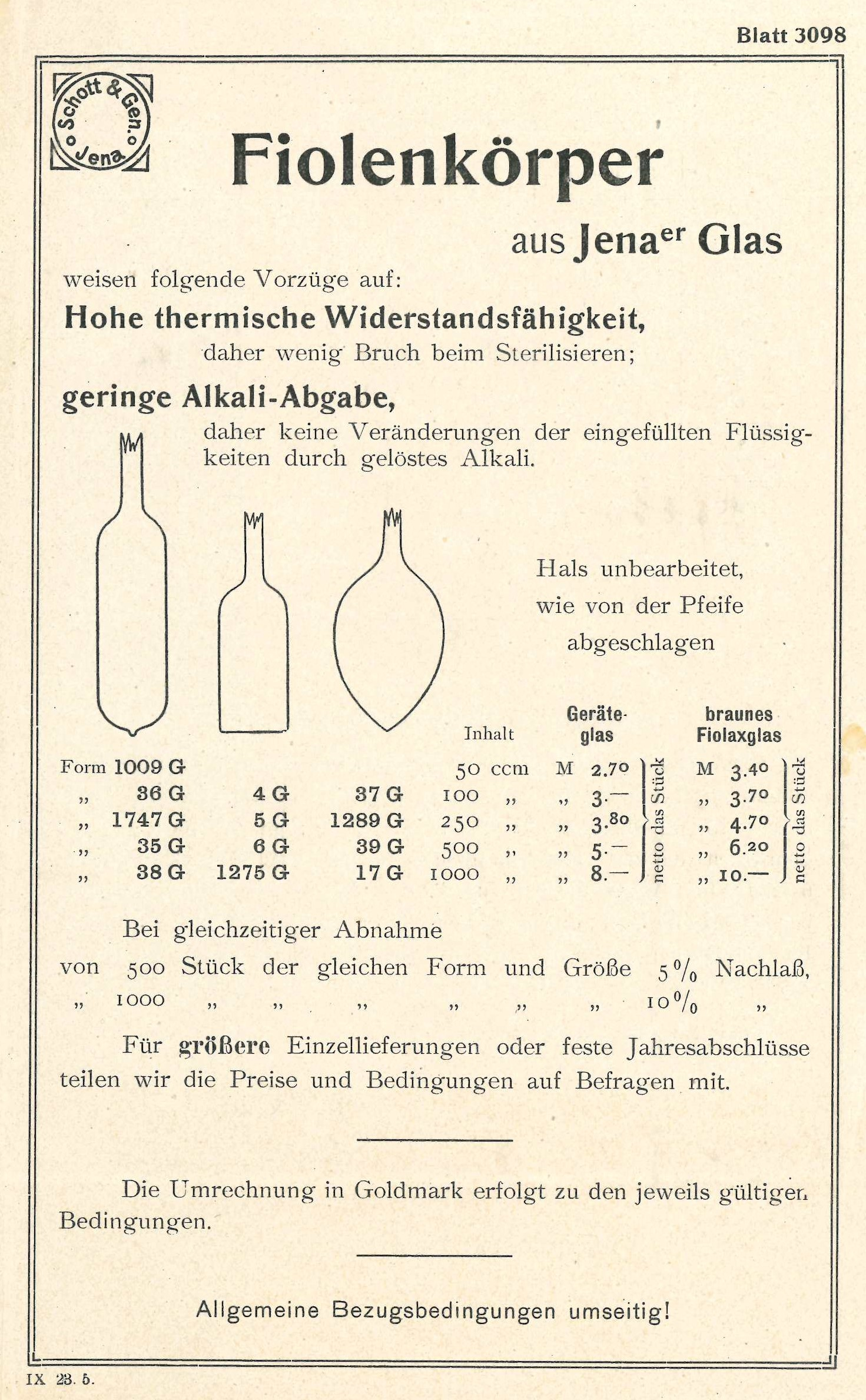
Schott & Gen. advertisement for borosilicate glass vials (1923)

In 1887, Otto Schott developed borosilicate glass, a form of glassware used to reagent bottles and flasks. From 1911, Schott manufactured borosilicate glass tubing for the production of pharmaceutical ampoules and vials.

Schott Pharma was established as a standalone company in 2022 under the name Schott Pharma AG & Co. KGaA through an equity carve-out (or spin-off) from Schott AG, a manufacturer of specialty glass and glass-ceramics. In the same year, the company announced their plans to present an IPO, but this was reportedly postponed to 2023 due to the Russian invasion of Ukraine.

In June 2023, Schott Pharma announced plans to hold the IPO in September 2023. This plan was enacted in September, with Schott Pharma going public on the Frankfurt Stock Exchange. The IPO was initially priced at €27 per share, and a potential valuation of up to 4.1 billion euros, but increased the share price to €30 the following day. The IPO was the largest of the year in Germany. In December 2023, Schott Pharma was included in the SDAX. Between September 2024 and March 2025, it was also listed in the MDAX.

== Production and manufacturing ==
Schott Pharma is headquartered in Mainz, Germany, and operates manufacturing sites in Europe, North America, South America, and Asia.

Its business is divided into two divisions, Drug Containment, involving production of pharmaceutical vials, cartridges, and glass ampoules, as well as Drug Delivery Systems with prefillable glass syringes and syringes made from Cyclic olefin copolymers (COC), suitable for deep-cold medications.

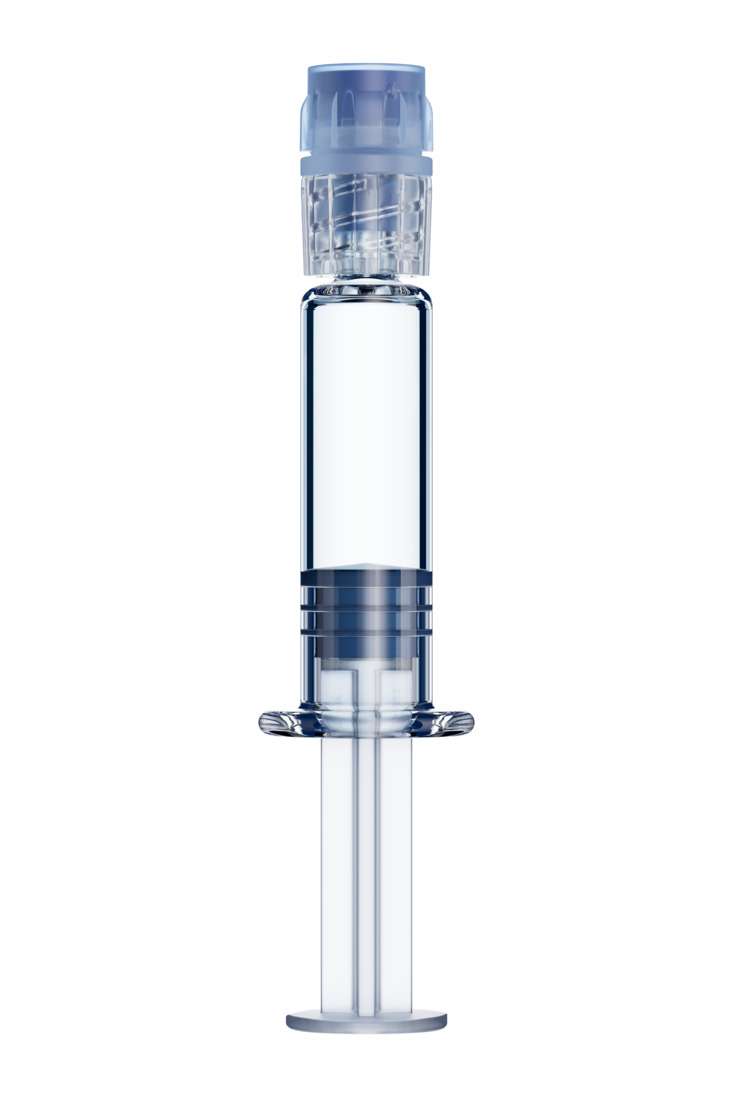
Prefillable glass syringe

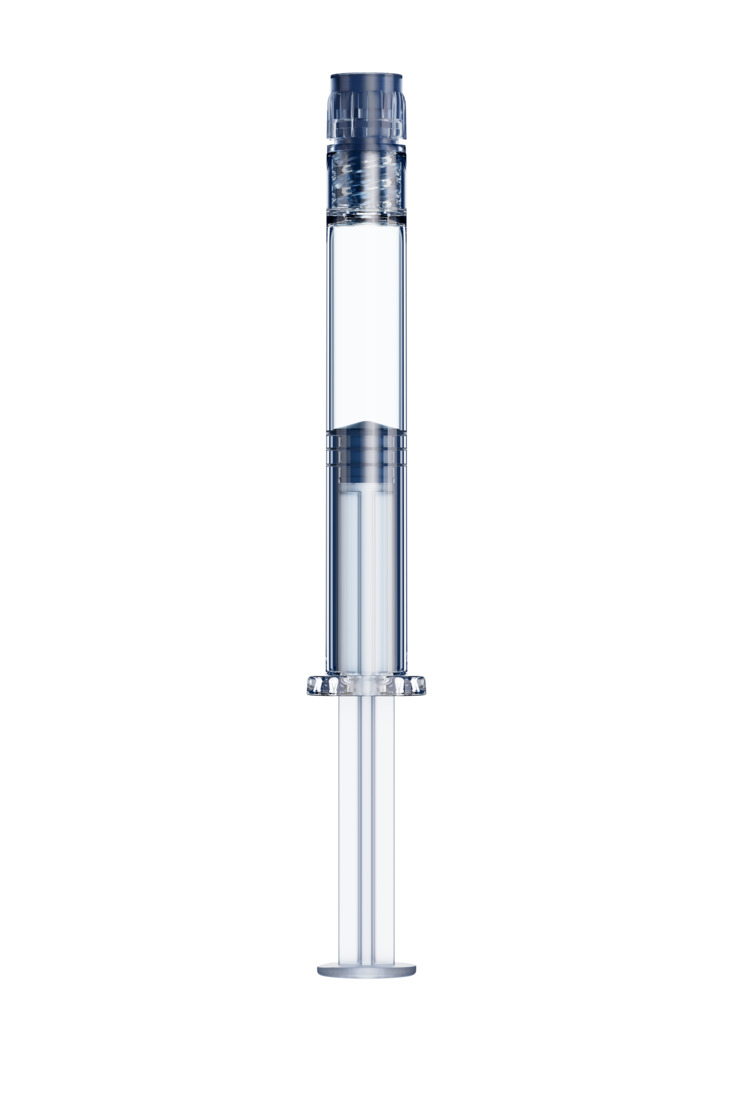
Prefillable polymer syringe

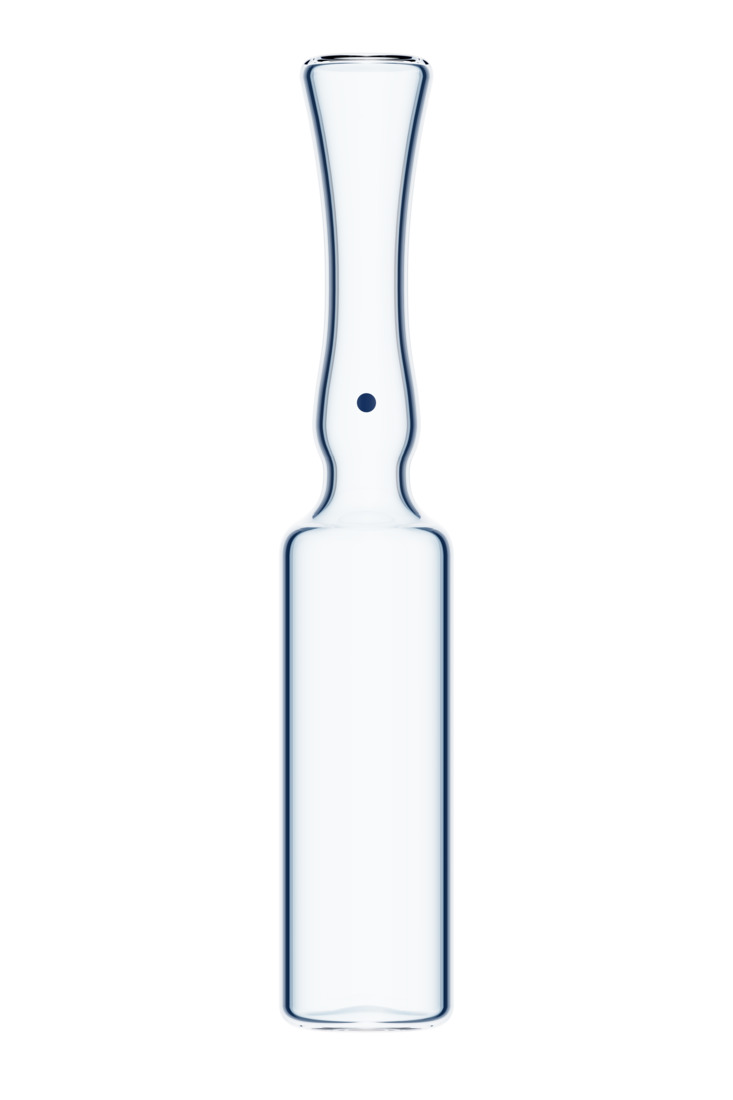
Ampoule

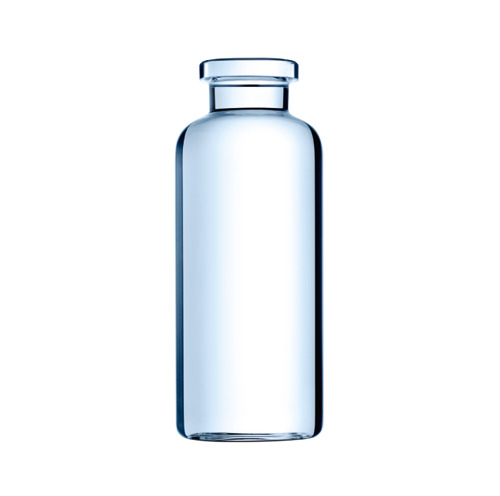
Vial

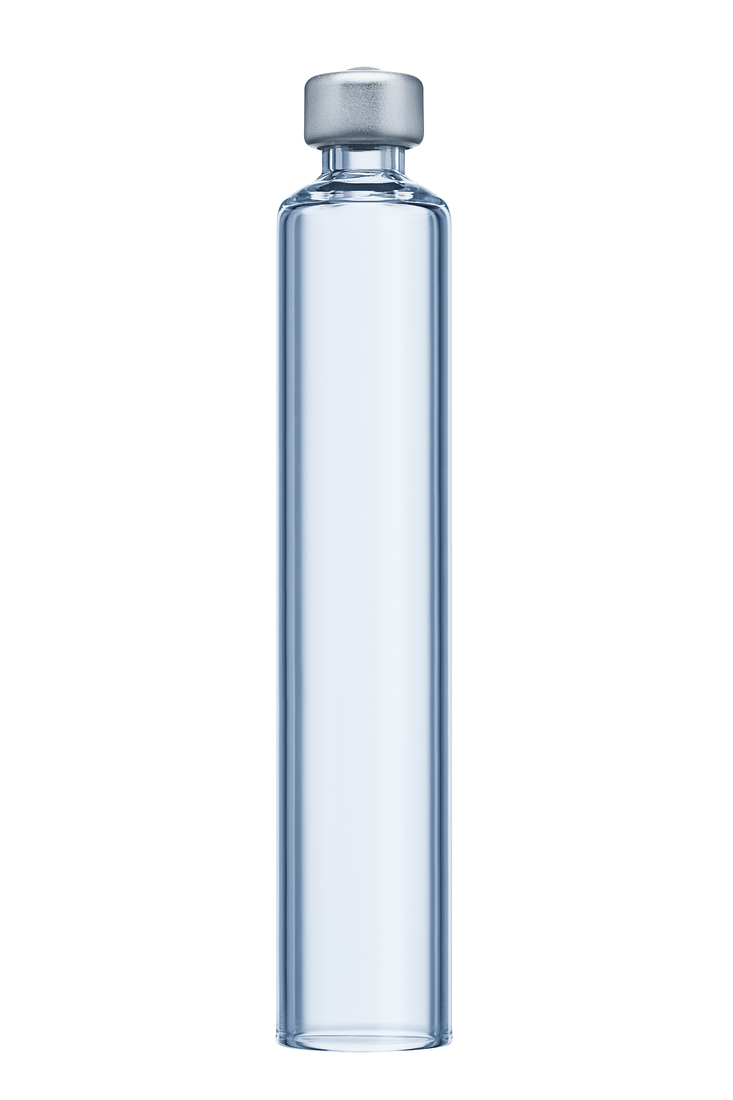
Cartridge

== Governance ==
Schott Pharma is a subsidiary of SCHOTT AG, which holds controlling shares (as of 2023: 77%). SCHOTT AG is owned by the Carl Zeiss Foundation.

Schott Pharma is listed on the Frankfurt Stock Exchange's MDAX.

=== Independent Supervisory Board ===
The supervisory board for the Schott Pharma AG is as follows:

- Peter Goldschmidt, (chairman)
- Dr. Wolfram Carius (Executive Vice President of Bayer AG)
- Eva Kienle (CFO of KWS Saat SE & Co. KGaA)
- Ann-Kristin Erkens (Corporate Senior Vice President, Financial and Business Controlling at Henkel Adhesive Technologies)
- Christine Wening (employee stakeholder)
- Mario Just (employee stakeholder)

== Financial Results ==
	2022/23	2023/24	2024/25
Revenue in €m	899	957	986
Employees	4,646	4,690	4,811
