= Grete Unrein =

German politician (1872–1945)

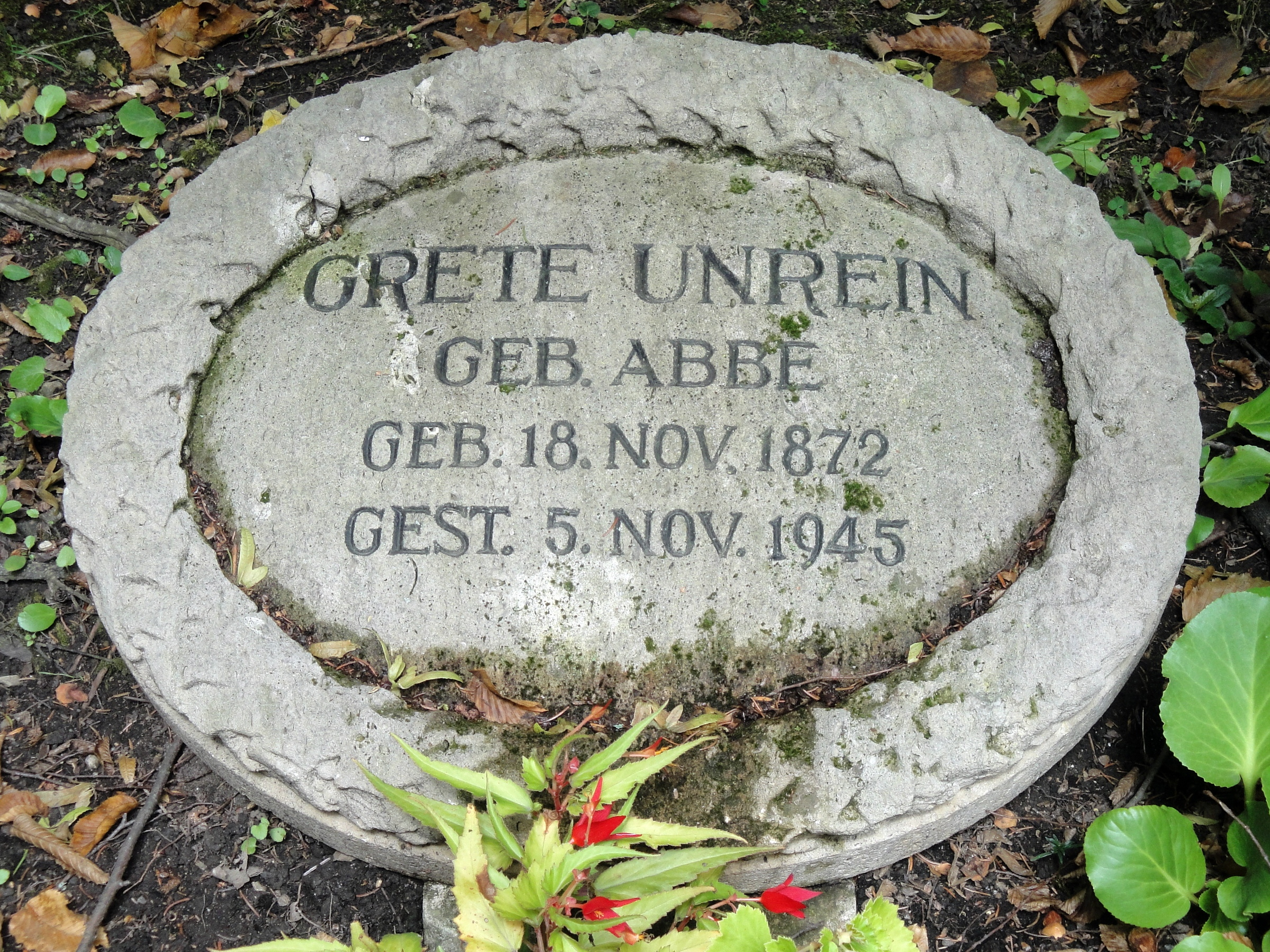
Grave of Grete Unrein in the North Cemetery of Jena

Grete Unrein (née Grete Abbe, 18 November 1872—5 November 1945) was a German politician from Jena active during the Weimar Republic, with a particular interest in social services. With her husband Otto Unrein she established the Jena Lyceum in 1912, now the Grete Unrein Comprehensive School (Integrierte Gesamtschule "Grete Unrein").

== Biography ==
The eldest daughter of wealthy industrialist Ernst Abbe, Grete Unrein had a long history of work with charitable institutions in Jena. Since the founding of the Jena Children's Hospital she endeavoured to improve its economic situation, and was also head of the Jena maternity home, a board member and chairwoman of the women's union of the Red Cross, and a patron and board member of the reading hall club (Lesehallenverein). One of her most important efforts was in providing girls and young women with equal opportunities for training and in establishing their own professions. It is thanks to Unrein's tireless work that the city of Jena took on this goal and built a "higher school for girls", the Jena Lyceum. Together with her husband Otto Unrein, the Lyceum's first rector, she worked to expand the Lyceum until it offered education to the Abitur level.

In 1919 she ran a successful campaign for Jena city council as a member of the German Democratic Party, and was especially active on the committee for youth services. In 1932 she was elected the deputy chairperson of the city council and was granted honorary citizenship of Jena, "in honour of her services to the common good, especially in the field of social welfare, on her 60th birthday". As a gesture of protest, she refused along with her fellow councillors from the SPD and the Communist Party to participate in the city council meeting of 9 March 1933, when the Nazi Party seized control of the Jena city administration. During the Nazi era she often had to endure political and personal persecution. During these years, she campaigned for the rights of Jewish citizens persecuted by the Nazi regime, providing personal and financial assistance. She was the sole heir to Clara Rosenthal, a Jewish artist driven to suicide in 1941, whose family had been close with her father.

After the end of World War II, she was one of the first members of the newly founded Liberal Democratic Party (LDP), a successor to the Democratic Party. Her health deteriorated rapidly and she died at her home on Johann-Friedrich-Strasse 3 in Jena on 5 November 1945. She is buried in the North Cemetery (Nordfriedhof) in Jena.

== Grete-Unrein Prize ==
Since 2005, the Young Liberals of Jena-Weimar have given an annual award titled the Grete Unrein Prize for "special honorary commitment in the field of youth work". The prize is endowed with a total of €700: a first-place award of €500 and two second-place awards of €100.
