= Schott AG =

German glass company

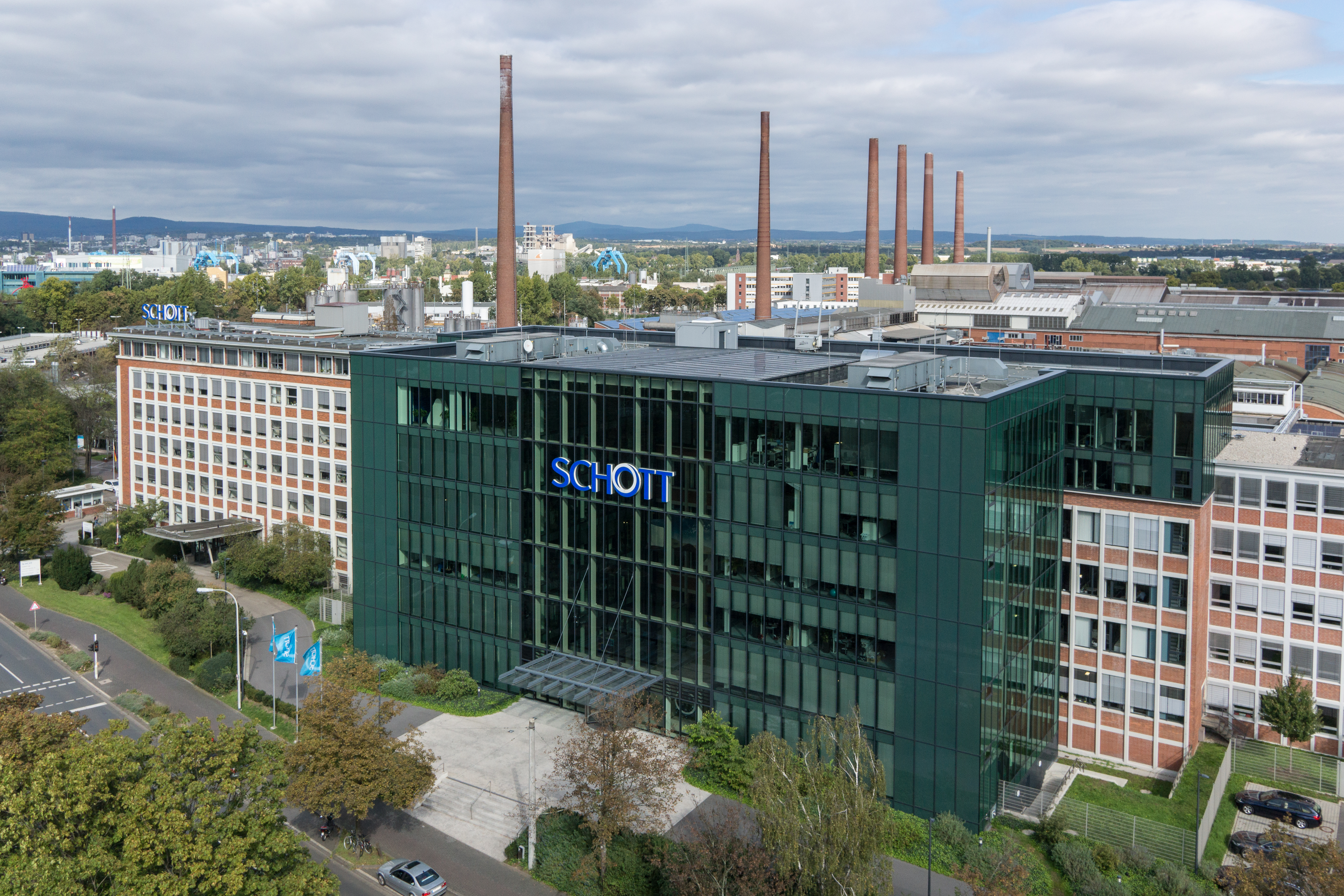
- Type: Aktiengesellschaft
- Industry: Glass
- Founded: 1884; 142 years ago Jena, Germany
- Founders: Otto Schott; Ernst Abbe; Carl Zeiss; Roderich Zeiss
- Headquarters: Mainz, Germany
- Key people: Stefan Brandl (Chairman of the Management Board)
- Services: Glass Manufacturing
- Revenue: 2.8 billion euro (2024/2025)
- Owner: Carl-Zeiss-Stiftung
- Number of employees: 17,392 (2025)
- Website: schott.com

Schott AG is a German multinational glass company specializing in the manufacture of glass and glass-ceramics. Headquartered in Mainz, Rhineland-Palatinate, Germany, it is owned by the Carl Zeiss Foundation. The company's founder and namesake, Otto Schott, is credited with the invention of borosilicate glass.

== History ==
=== Origins and Company Foundation (Pre-1884 – 1919) ===
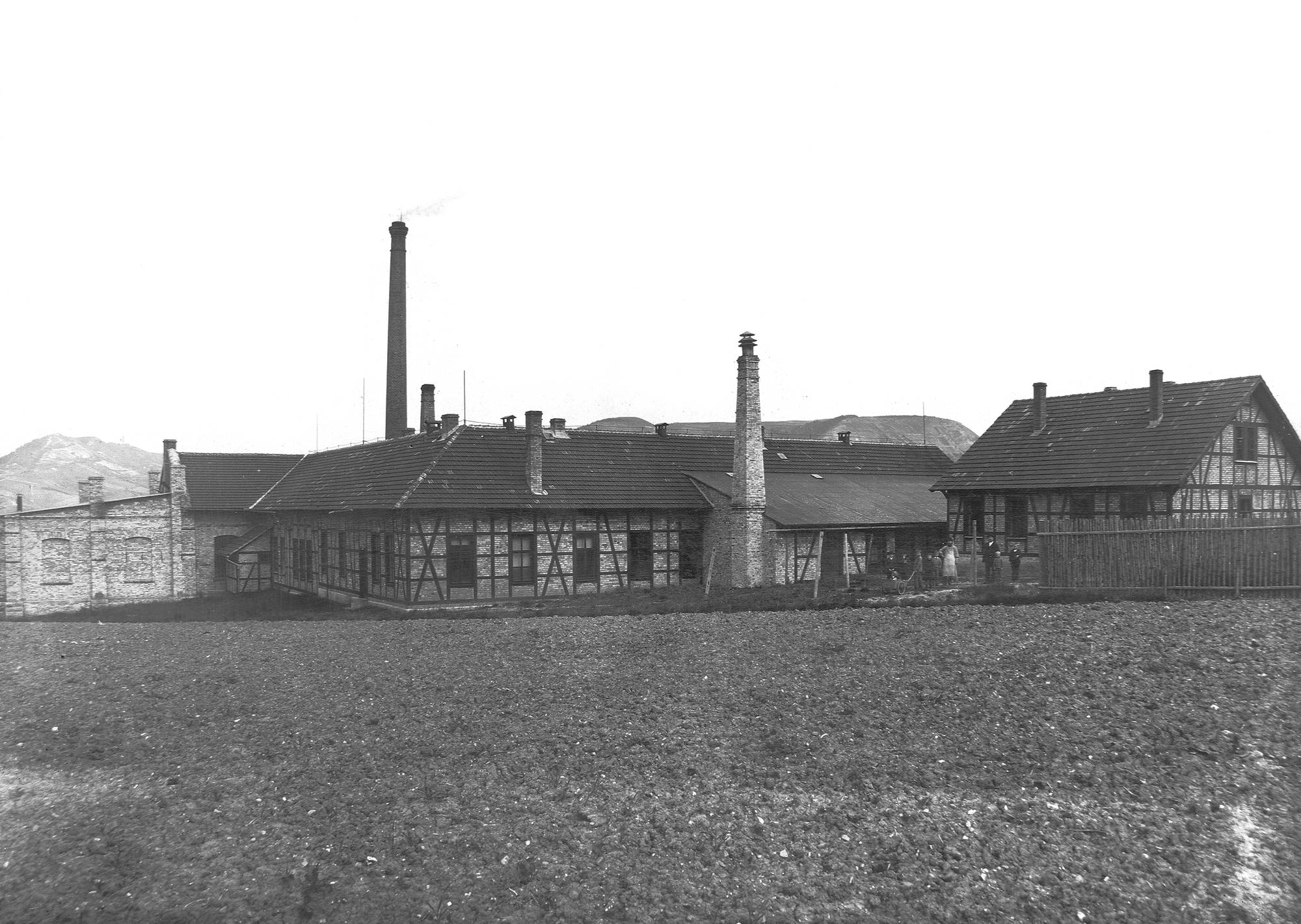
The glass technical laboratory founded in Jena in 1884

The first hexagonal segments for the main mirror of the Extremely Large Telescope (ELT) being cast by Schott

Otto Schott began researching glass chemistry in the 1870s, driven by a scientific interest in the properties of glass and its potential for technical applications. His work attracted the attention of physicist Ernst Abbe and precision instrument maker Carl Zeiss, who recognized the importance of specialized glass in advancing optical technologies.

In 1884, Otto Schott, Ernst Abbe, Carl Zeiss and his son Roderich Zeiss founded the Glastechnische Laboratorium Schott & Genossen (Glass Technical Laboratory Schott & Associates) in Jena, Thuringia, Germany which initially produced optical glasses for microscopes and telescopes.

Among its early developments was borosilicate glass, notable for its resistance to chemicals, heat, and temperature changes. This material paved the way for new technical glasses for thermometers, laboratory equipment, and gas lamps. Around 1908, the company began manufacturing glass tubing which was used for pharmaceutical packaging. In 1918, it introduced heat-resistant borosilicate household glassware under the brand name Jenaer Glas (Jena glass). In this period, the company experienced economic success. By 1919, the company had grown significantly, employing a workforce of over 1,200 people.

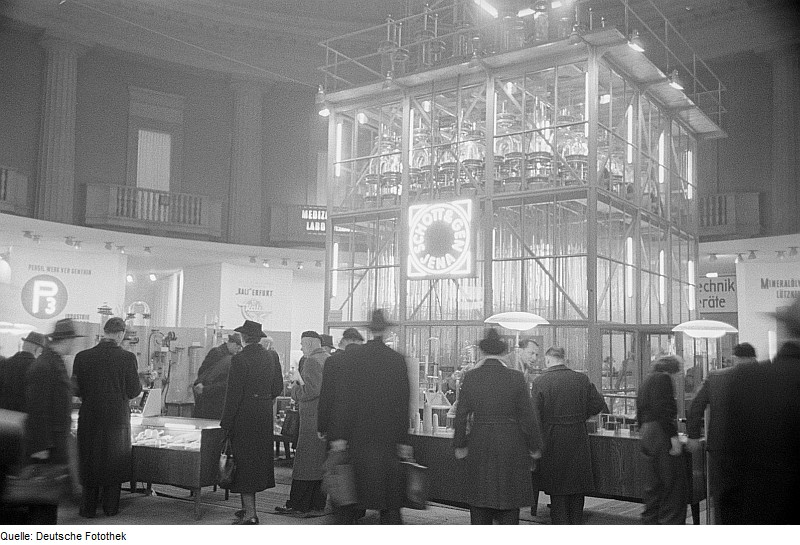
Products of Jenaer Glaswerks Schott & Gen at an exhibition in 1951

In 1919, Otto Schott transferred his shares to the Carl Zeiss Foundation, which had been founded by Ernst Abbe in 1889 and first became a partner in the company in 1891. This made the glass laboratory a foundation company, subsequently renamed Jenaer Glaswerk Schott & Gen (Jena Glassworks Schott & Assoc.).

=== Expansion and Diversification (1920 – 1939) ===
In 1927, Erich Schott, the son of Otto Schott, assumed management of the company. Under his leadership, the company established new business segments, acquired subsidiaries, and modernized its operations, introducing early forms of automated manufacturing processes.

Beginning in 1924, the company designed household glassware with members of the Bauhaus movement, who were active in nearby Weimar. In 1924, Walter Gropius proposed a collaboration to improve the design of household glassware. Beginning in 1930, Schott produced the Sintrax coffee machine, designed by Gerhard Marcks. In 1931, it hired Wilhelm Wagenfeld as a designer, who created a tea service, glass baking dishes, and casserole dishes. During the 30s, it also worked with Hungarian Bauhaus Professor László Moholy-Nagy, who was involved in marketing for Jenaer Glas up through 1937.

Between 1927 and 1929, the company acquired glassworks in Zwiesel and Pirna (Vereinigte Zwieseler und Pirnaer Farbenglaswerke AG). In 1930, it acquired Deutsche Spiegelglas AG (DESAG) in Grünenplan.

=== Split ===
In the midst of Germany's political division after World War II, the Jena factory was expropriated and transformed into a Publicly Owned Enterprise (VEB) in 1948. The company was divided in half: VEB Jenaer Glaswerk in Jena in East Germany, later integrated into the VEB Carl Zeiss Jena collective, and Jenaer Glaswerk Schott & Gen in Mainz in West Germany. While VEB Jenaer Glaswerk developed into a specialty glass supplier in the Eastern Bloc, the other half developed into an international group in Mainz with sales offices abroad. The company became a specialist glass manufacturer with products including glass components for television tubes, fiber optics for light and image conductors, mirror substrates for giant telescopes, glass-ceramic cooktop panels (serial production from 1973) and glass tubes for parabolic trough power plants. Following the German reunification, the Mainz plant assumed Jena's company shares.

=== Late 20th century ===
The company experienced growth in the first decade after the fall of the Berlin Wall. Schott Glas, as it became known in 1998, developed into a technology group with 80 companies in 32 countries and global sales of over 3 billion Deutschmark. Schott had been operating at only 40 sites in ten countries with global sales of DM 1.31 billion in 1984. In 2004, Schott Glas converted from a dependent enterprise of its sister enterprise Carl Zeiss (Oberkochen) to become a legally independent Aktiengesellschaft—Schott AG. The Carl Zeiss Foundation remains the sole shareholder of Schott AG. The Foundation Statute does not permit to sell its shares, ruling out the prospect of an IPO.

=== Solar industry ===
The technology group entered the solar industry in 2001, founding Schott Solar GmbH in 2005 (renamed Schott Solar AG in 2008). In 2008, Schott announced that it planned to produce crystalline photovoltaic cells and modules with a total of 450 MW annually. It also planned to produce thin-film PV wafers with a capacity of 100 MW. In 2009, the company inaugurated a US$100 million solar manufacturing facility in Albuquerque, New Mexico, USA to build solar receivers for concentrated solar thermal power plants (CSP) and 64 MW of photovoltaic modules. They had already been making 15 MW of photovoltaics annually in Billerica, Massachusetts, until the factory was closed in 2009. The company was also engaged in concentrated solar power technology, by manufacturing solar receiver tubes. In June 2012, Schott announced that its Albuquerque plant would close down, laying off all photovoltaic cell manufacturing employees immediately and ramping down the remaining employees over the rest of the summer. Schott withdrew from its solar business in 2012 and Schott Solar AG was dissolved.

== Company profile ==
Stefan Brandl is the company's CEO. He took over in November 2026 from Torsten Derr.

SCHOTT reported sales worth 2.05 billion Euros in its fiscal year 2016–2017. In 2017–2018 sales increase to 2.08 billion euros with an annual profit of 208 million euros. In 2019, SCHOTT reported sales worth 2.2. billion Euros with an annual profit of 206 million euros. SCHOTT AG employs around 16.200 people in production and sales facilities in 34 countries, including around 5,800 in Germany (as of 2019). SCHOTT increased its global sales by 2.2% in 2020 to reach US$2.5 billion, with an improved operating profit (EBIT) of US$320 million. The number of employees rose to around 16,500.

The sole owner of Schott AG is the Carl Zeiss Foundation, which holds all shares and is partly financed from the dividends.

== Operations ==
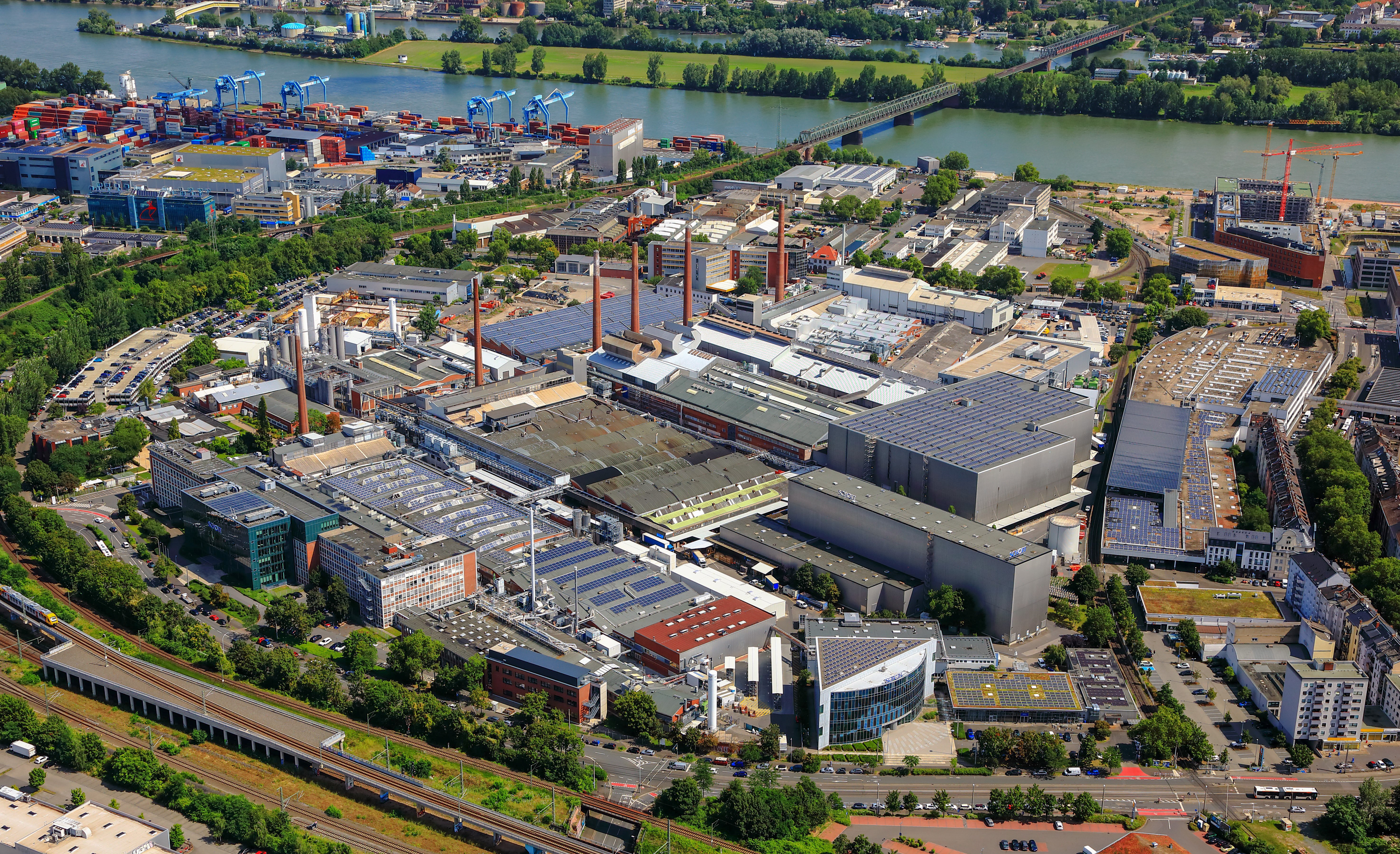
Schott headquarters in Mainz

Schott's corporate headquarters and largest site is located in Mainz, Germany. Its main business regions are Europe, North America, and Asia. In Europe, it operates production sites in six locations in Germany, as well as in the Czech Republic, Finland, France, Hungary, Italy, Switzerland, and Turkey. In addition to its North American corporate office in Rye Brook, New York, it has six US production sites in Duryea and Lebanon, Pennsylvania; Southbridge, Massachusetts; Louisville, Kentucky; Vincennes, Indiana; and Phoenix, Arizona. In Asia, Schott has productions in India, Malaysia, and China.

== Products ==
Schott produces products made of specialty glass, glass-ceramics, and polymers for industries such as home appliances, pharmaceuticals, electronics, semiconductors, optics, life sciences, automotive, aerospace and astronomy.

In the consumer market, glass-ceramics from Schott are used in cooktops for electric, gas, and induction cooking under the brand name Ceran.

In industry, its glass-ceramic Zerodur is used in microlithography and as mirror substrates for large optical telescopes such as:

- European Southern Observatory’s Very Large Telescope and Extremely Large Telescope in Chile,
- Gran Telescopio Canarias in Spain,
- Keck I and II telescopes at the W.M. Keck Observatory in Hawaii.

Other applications include flat glass for home appliances, components for consumer electronics and semiconductor manufacturing. It also produces glass and filters with applications in digital cameras, laser optics, machine vision, and metrology. Some of its more recent applications include ultra-thin and flexible cover glass for smartphone displays and glass wafers for augmented reality.

Schott's subsidiary Schott Pharma develops and produces pharmaceutical packaging such as ampoules, cartridges, syringes, and vials.

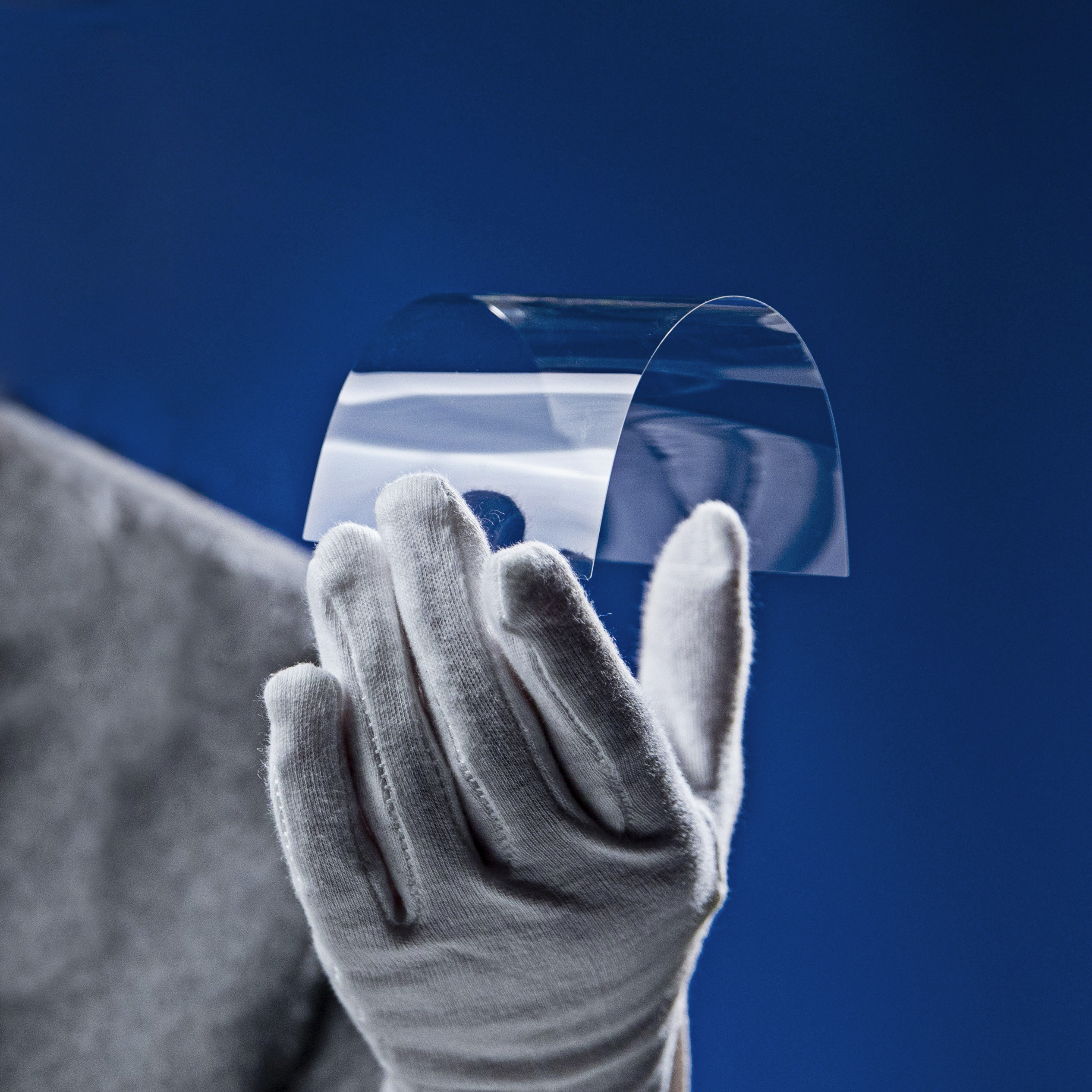
Ultra thin glass

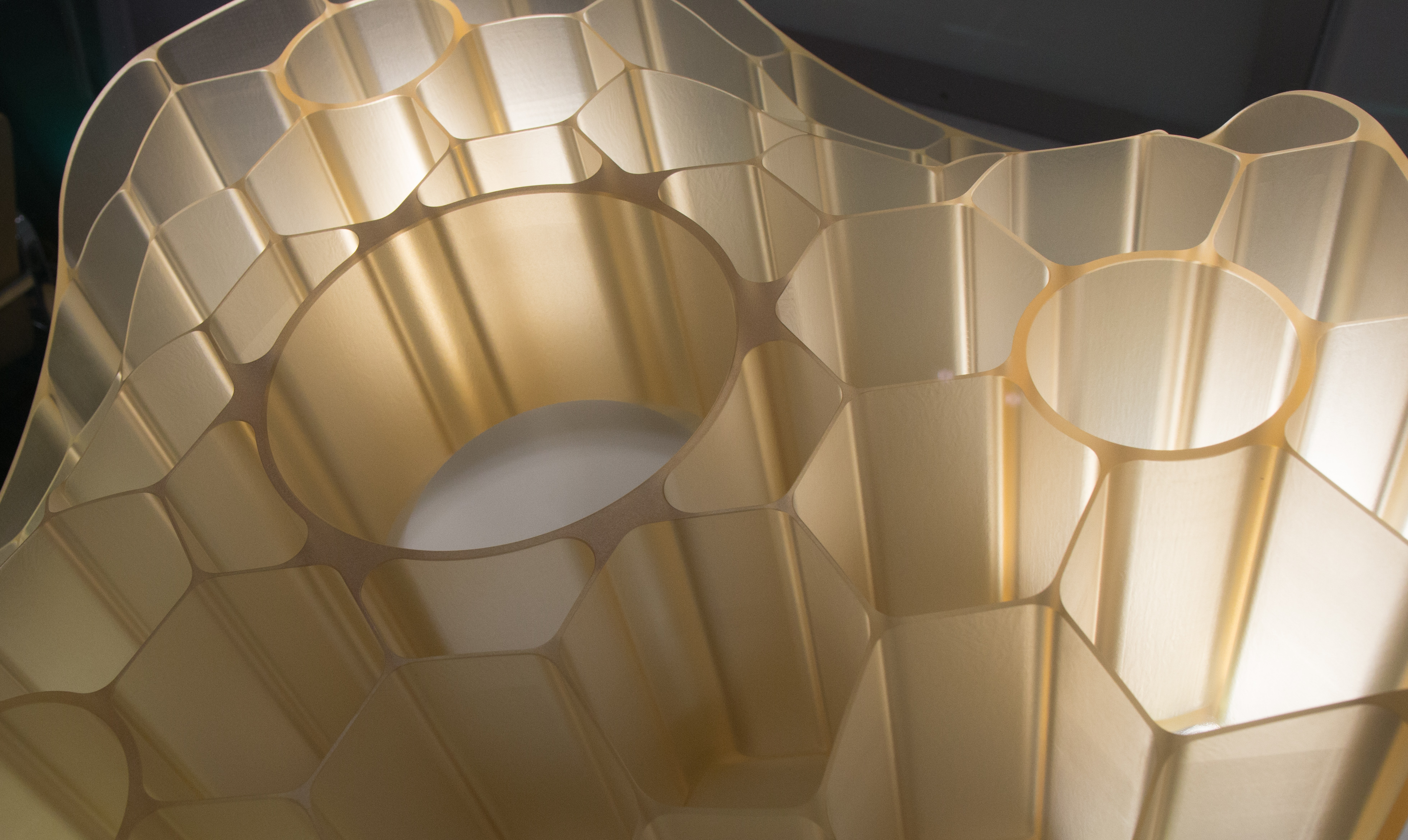
Zerodur lightweight mirror substrate

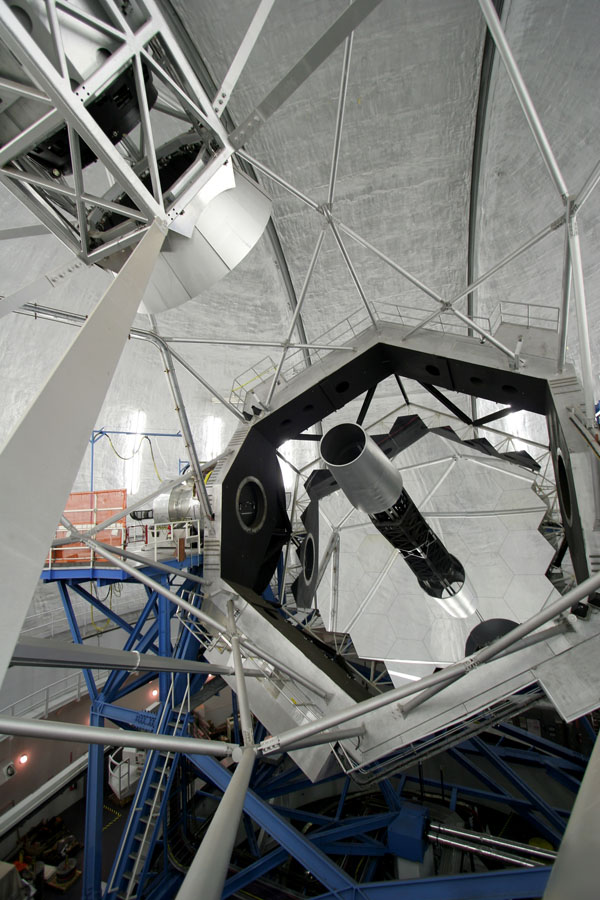
Keck II telescope's segmented primary mirror made of Zerodur

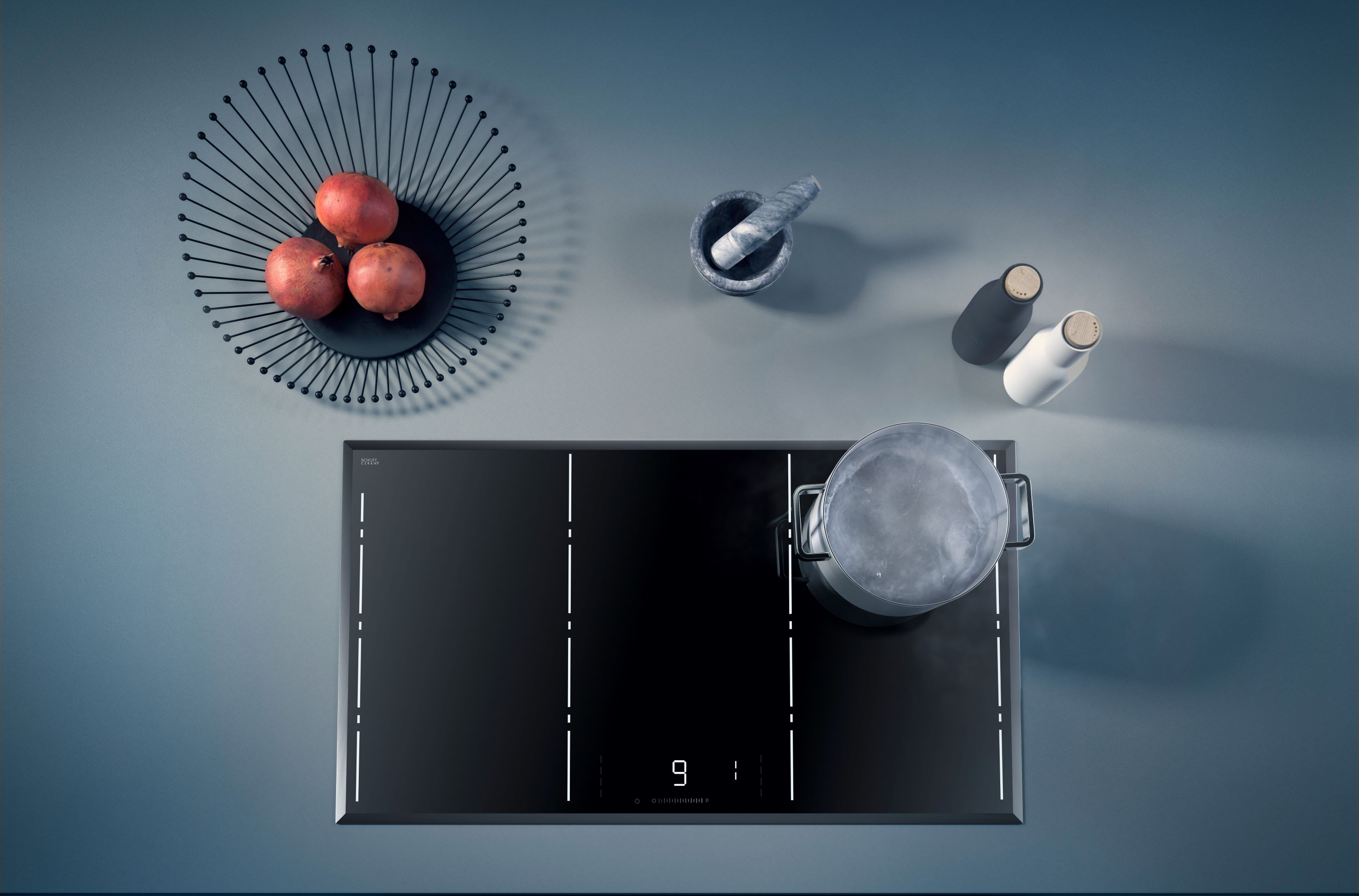
Ceran glass-ceramic cooktop

Schott AG at 9th Bengaluru Space Expo 2026, BIEC
