= Solid fat index =

Solid fat index (SFI) is a measure of the percentage of fat in crystalline (solid) phase to total fat (the remainder being in liquid phase) across a temperature gradient. The SFI of a fat is measured using a dilatometer that measures the expansion of a fat as it is heated; density measurements are taken at a series of standardized temperature check points. The resulting SFI/temperature curve is related to melting qualities and flavor. For example, butter has a sharp SFI curve, indicating that it melts quickly and that it releases flavor quickly.
