= Optical dilatometer =

An optical dilatometer is a non-contact device able to measure thermal expansions or sintering kinetics of any kind of materials, unlike traditional push rod dilatometer, it can push up to the dilatometric softening of the specimen. It is a device for measuring changes in the dimensions of a specimen, optically, the achieved resolution can result in greater values than those of a conventional pushrod dilatometer. A monochromatic light source, such as a laser, illuminates the specimen. Some of the light is reflected by the specimen and interferes with the incoming light, creating optical interference fringes. As the specimen contracts or expands, there is a proportional movement of the interference fringes, which can be measured using a camera system. The measurement resolution is determined by the wavelength of the light, and is typically 0.5 μm for blue light. Optical dilatometers are used to measure thermal expansion.

The optical dilatometer is in fact complementary to the traditional higher resolution push rod dilatometer when it comes to measure dimensional changes of materials, as a function of temperature, and no contact between specimen and instrument is required.

== Structure and types ==
The most recent types of optical dilatometer use a direct-beam system so as to avoid contact-related problems by measuring the image that the specimen projects on an image sensor, when irradiated by a light beam. By using a single beam of light with short wavelength and a very high resolution image sensor it is possible to achieve good resolutions, although not comparable to those of the standard dilatometers. For example, using a blue light with a wavelength below 1500 micrometers, it is possible to achieve images with an actual resolution of nearly 1500 micrometers/pixel of the camera (not an interpolated resolution but an actual resolution). By using two light beams, which illuminate two small portions of material at the extremities of the sample, set perpendicularly to the beams direction, it is then possible to achieve an absolute measurement of longitudinal variation while heat-treating the specimen.

There are two major types of optical dilatometers which are currently in use:

- Horizontal Optical Dilatometer: the rod-specimen is laid horizontally on the sample holder and, during the thermal treatment in the oven, it is completely free to expand and contract. The displacement of the sample holder is not relevant for the result of the measurement because the optical system follows the horizontal movements of small portions of the specimen at its extremities.
- Vertical Optical Dilatometer: the rod-specimen is set vertically on the sample holder (alumina thin plate) and while one camera “watches” the top of the plate the other follows the vertical displacements of the sample’s top edge. This system has been used so far to find the characteristic temperatures (phase transitions, maximum sintering speed, swelling, etc.) of ceramic materials. In fact, phase transitions are always associated to dimension variation of the material: sintering is accompanied by high shrinkages, related to the decrease of porosity -swelling usually appears at high temperatures. After sintering occurs and the viscosity of the ceramics formulation strongly decreases and trapped gas is then free to exit.

== History ==
The first optical dilatometer was invented by Abbe and Fizeau in the second half of 19th century. This design has a reflected beam of monochromatic light and the measurement of the displacement is carried out by counting the interference fringes between the forward going beam and the reflected beam. After the Abbe invention, many improvements were achieved on the original design and there are now many models available on the market, which use modern optics and designs.

Over the last five decades, interest has grown in the use of thermomechanical technologies for characterising materials in different fields of science and engineering. In particular, the use of optical methods has been playing a role in the field of ceramics and have been used to measure the coefficient of thermal expansion of bodies and glazes in order to ensure an optimal match of their thermomechanical behaviour.

== Applications and fields of research ==
In order to measure thermal expansion up to high temperatures, the material to be tested has to be set on a sample holder inside an oven which has its own thermal expansion. In order to achieve a good accuracy it is necessary to measure the expansion of the sample holder and to subtract it from the actual expansion of the specimen. The best approach is to split the laser beam into two beams of light, which are reflected by the top-edge of the sample and by the top-edge of the sample holder, or by both longitudinal edges of the specimen. By detecting the longitudinal variations at both the extremities of the specimen the measurement achieved is absolute and there is no need for further corrections. This is the most accurate way of measuring thermal expansion and it may attain nanometric resolution. This is the type of instrument used by the suppliers of certified standard materials. For example, the National Institute for Standards and Technology uses a Fizeau double-beam interferometer to certify the thermal expansion of their certified reference materials. This method has proved to be very accurate, with a resolution of a fraction of the wavelength of the incident light, but it is limited by the reflectivity of the surface of the specimen. If the specimen is not reflective, or it becomes non reflective during the test, it is then necessary to use a mirror, which is set in contact with the specimen by using a refractory push rod. By doing so such method loses the advantage of being non contact and becomes substantially similar to the electronic dilatometer.

Optical dilatometers are used along traditional dilatometers in ceramics for non-destructive testing of a sample's behavior during a thermal treatment. Optical dilatometers are used for thermal analysis of various types of materials, such as incoherent materials (expansion and contraction of an incoherent granular frit, as applied, for example, on raw tiles) and polymers (behaviour above the glass transition temperature, where the surface tension starts pulling the edges and making the sample shrink), as well as for analysis of various processes in materials manufacturing, for example, sintering kinetics, thermal expansion and sintering behaviour of thin glaze layer or polymer thin films.

== See also ==
- Dilatometer
- Thermal Analysis
