= Dilatometer =

Instrument measuring volume changes

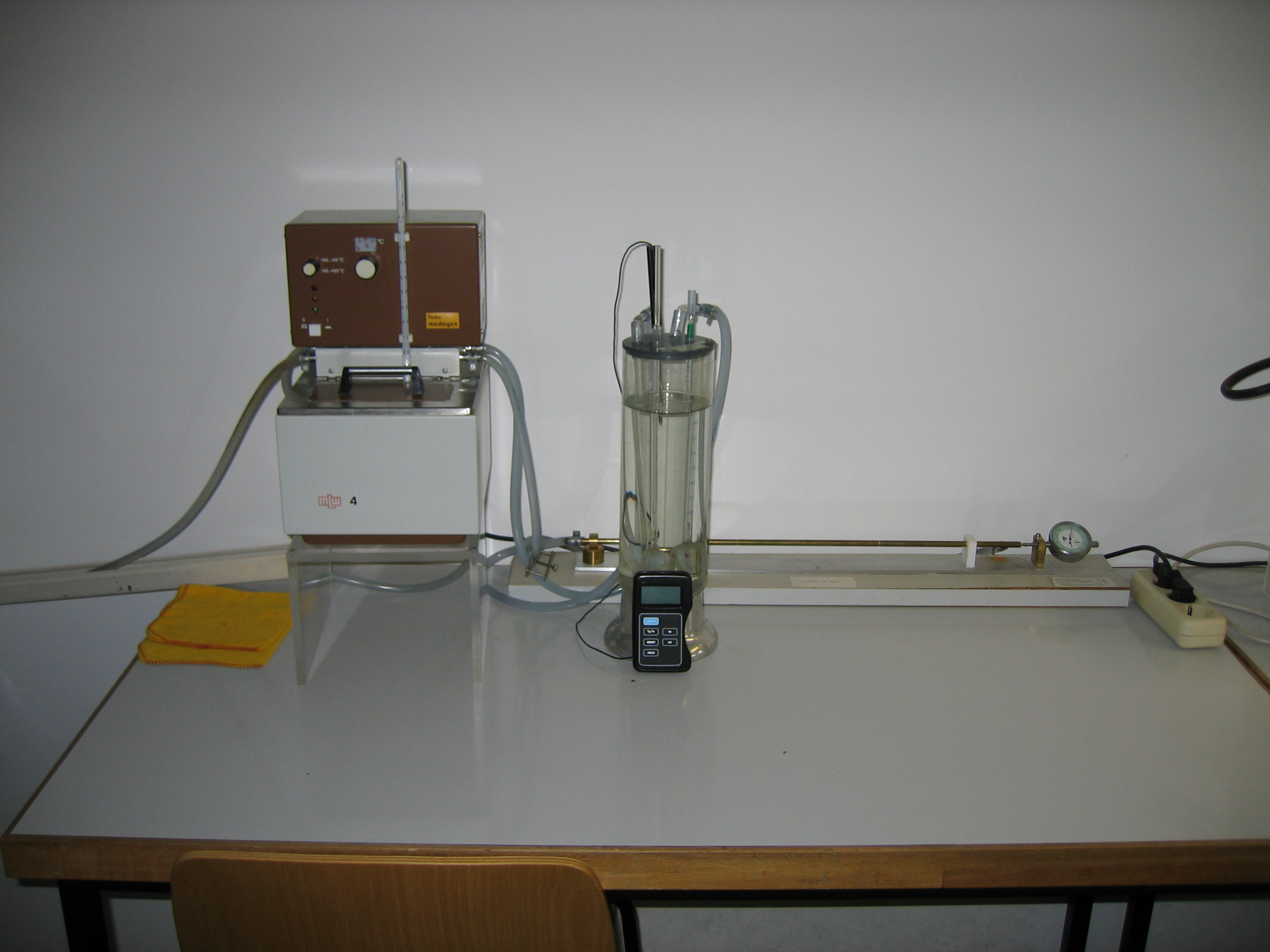
A simple structure of a dilatometer for the measurement of the thermal expansion of liquids and solids

A dilatometer is a scientific instrument that measures volume changes caused by a physical or chemical process. A familiar application of a dilatometer is the mercury-in-glass thermometer, in which the change in volume of the liquid column is read from a graduated scale. Because mercury has a fairly constant rate of expansion over ambient temperature ranges, the volume changes are directly related to temperature.

== Applications ==
Dilatometers have been used in the fabrication of metallic alloys, study of martensite transformation, compressed and sintered refractory compounds, glasses, ceramic products, composite materials, and plastics.

Dilatometry is also used to monitor the progress of chemical reactions, particularly those displaying a substantial molar volume change (e.g., polymerisation). A specific example is the rate of phase changes.

In food science, dilatometers are used to measure the solid fat index of food oils and butter.

Another common application of a dilatometer is the measurement of thermal expansion. Thermal expansivity is an important engineering parameter, and is defined as:

$$\alpha = \frac{1}{V} \biggl(\frac{\partial V}{\partial T} \biggr)_{p,N}\$$

== Types ==
There are a number of dilatometer types:

- Capacitance dilatometers possess a parallel plate capacitor with a one stationary plate, and one moveable plate. When the sample length changes, it moves the moveable plate, which changes the gap between the plates. The capacitance is inversely proportional to the gap. Changes in length of 10 picometres can be detected.
- Connecting rod (push rod) dilatometer, the sample which can be examined is in the furnace. A connecting rod transfers the thermal expansion to a strain gauge, which measures the shift. Since the measuring system (connecting rod) is exposed to the same temperature as the sample and thereby likewise expands, one obtains a relative value, which must be converted afterwards. Matched low-expansion materials and differential constructions can be used to minimize the influence of connecting rod expansion
- High Resolution - Laser Dilatometer Highest resolution and absolute accuracy is possible with a Michelson Interferometer type Laser Dilatometer. Resolution goes up to picometres. On top the principle of interference measurement give the possibility for much higher accuracies and it is an absolute measurement technique with no need of calibration.
- Optical dilatometer is an instrument that measures dimension variations of a specimen heated at temperatures that generally range from 25 to 1400 °C. The optical dilatometer allows the monitoring of materials’ expansions and contractions by using a non-contact method: optical group connected to a digital camera captures the images of the expanding/contracting specimen as function of the temperature with a resolution of about ±70 micrometre per pixel. As the system allows to heat up the material and measures its longitudinal/vertical movements without any contact between instrument and specimen, it is possible to analyse the most ductile materials, such as the polymers, as well as the most fragile, such as the incoherent ceramic powders for sintering process.

For simpler measurements in a temperature range from 0 to 100 °C, where water is heated up and flow or over the sample. If linear coefficients of expansion of a metal is to be measured, hot water will run through a pipe made from the metal. The pipe warms up to the temperature of the water and the relative expansion can be determined as a function of the water temperature.

For the measurement of the volumetric expansion of liquids one takes a large glass container filled with water. In an expansion tank (glass container with an accurate volume scale) with the sample liquid. If one heats the water up, the sample liquid expands and the volume changes is read. However the expansion of the sample container must also be taken into consideration.

The expansion and retraction coefficient of gases cannot be measured using dilatometer, since the pressure plays a role here. For such measurements a gas thermometer is more suitable.

Dilatometers often include a mechanism for controlling temperature. This may be a furnace for measurements at elevated temperatures (temperatures to 2000 °C), or a cryostat for measurements at temperatures below room temperature. Metallurgical applications often involve sophisticated temperature controls capable of applying precise temperature-time profiles for heating and quenching the sample.

== See also ==
- Optical dilatometer
- Strain gauge
