= Ernst Abbe =

German physicist, entrepreneur, and social reformer (1840–1905)

Ernst Abbe HonFRMS
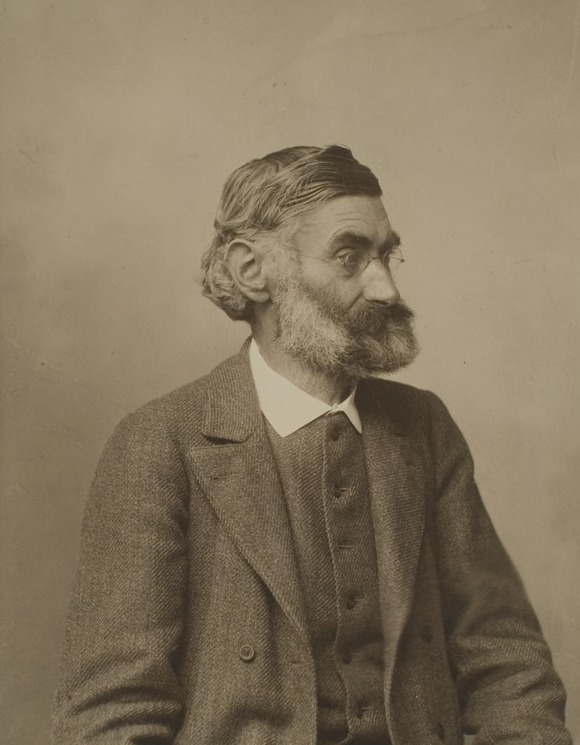
- Born: Ernst Karl Abbe; 23 January 1840; Eisenach, Saxe-Weimar-Eisenach
- Died: 14 January 1905 (aged 64); Jena, German Empire
- Education: University of Göttingen; University of Jena
- Known for: Abbe refractometer; Abbe number
- Scientific career
- Fields: Physics; Optical engineering
- Workplaces: University of Jena
- Doctoral advisor: Wilhelm Eduard Weber; Karl Snell
- Doctoral students: Heinrich Friedrich Weber
- Other notable students: Gottlob Frege

Ernst Karl Abbe (23 January 1840 – 14 January 1905), was a German businessman, optical engineer, physicist, and social reformer. Together with Otto Schott and Carl Zeiss, he developed numerous optical instruments. He was also a co-owner of Carl Zeiss AG, a German manufacturer of scientific microscopes, astronomical telescopes, planetariums, and other advanced optical systems.

== Personal life ==
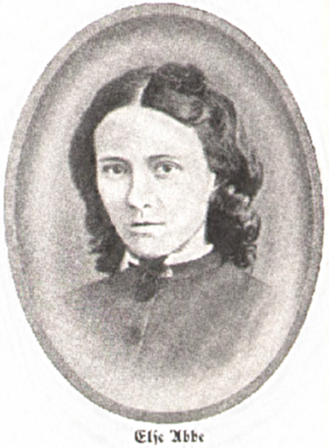
Else Snell

Abbe was born 23 January 1840 in Eisenach, Saxe-Weimar-Eisenach, to Georg Adam Abbe and Elisabeth Christina Barchfeldt. He came from a humble home – his father was a foreman in a spinnery. Supported by his father's employer, Abbe was able to attend secondary school and to obtain the general qualification for university entrance with fairly good grades, at the Eisenach Gymnasium, which he graduated from in 1857. By the time he left school, his scientific talent and his strong will had already become obvious. Thus, in spite of the family's strained financial situation, his father decided to support Abbe's studies at the Universities of Jena (1857–1859) and Göttingen (1859–1861). During his time as a student, Abbe gave private lessons to improve his income. His father's employer continued to fund him. Abbe was awarded his PhD in Göttingen on 23 March 1861. While at school, he was influenced by Bernhard Riemann and Wilhelm Eduard Weber, who also happened to be one of the Göttingen Seven. This was followed by two short assignments at the Göttingen observatory and at Physikalischer Verein in Frankfurt (an association of citizens interested in physics and chemistry that was founded by Johann Wolfgang von Goethe in 1824 and still exists today). On 8 August 1863 he qualified as a university lecturer at the University of Jena. In 1870, he accepted a contract as an associate professor of experimental physics, mechanics and mathematics in Jena. In 1871, he married Else Snell, daughter of the mathematician and physicist Karl Snell, one of Abbe's teachers, (Note: Some sources give his wife's name as Elisabeth.) with whom he had two daughters. He attained full professor status by 1879. He became director of the Jena astronomical and meteorological observatory in 1878. (Note: The dates of his job appointments at the University of Jena, including his appointment as director of the Jena Observatory has some uncertainty, as sources give different dates, as following. 1870: assistant lecturer on mechanics and experimental physics; 1873: associate professor; 1877: director of the Jena Observatory meteorological and astronomy departments.) In 1889, he became a member of the Bavarian Academy of Sciences and Humanities. He also was a member of the Saxon Academy of Sciences. He was relieved of his teaching duties at the University of Jena in 1891. Abbe died on 14 January 1905 in Jena. He was an atheist.

== Life work ==
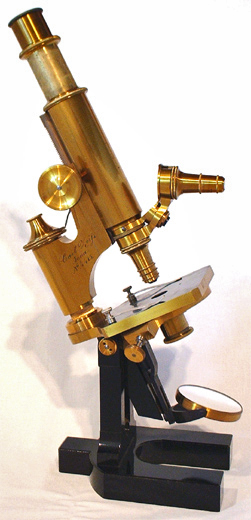
Microscope by Carl Zeiss (1879) with optics by Abbe

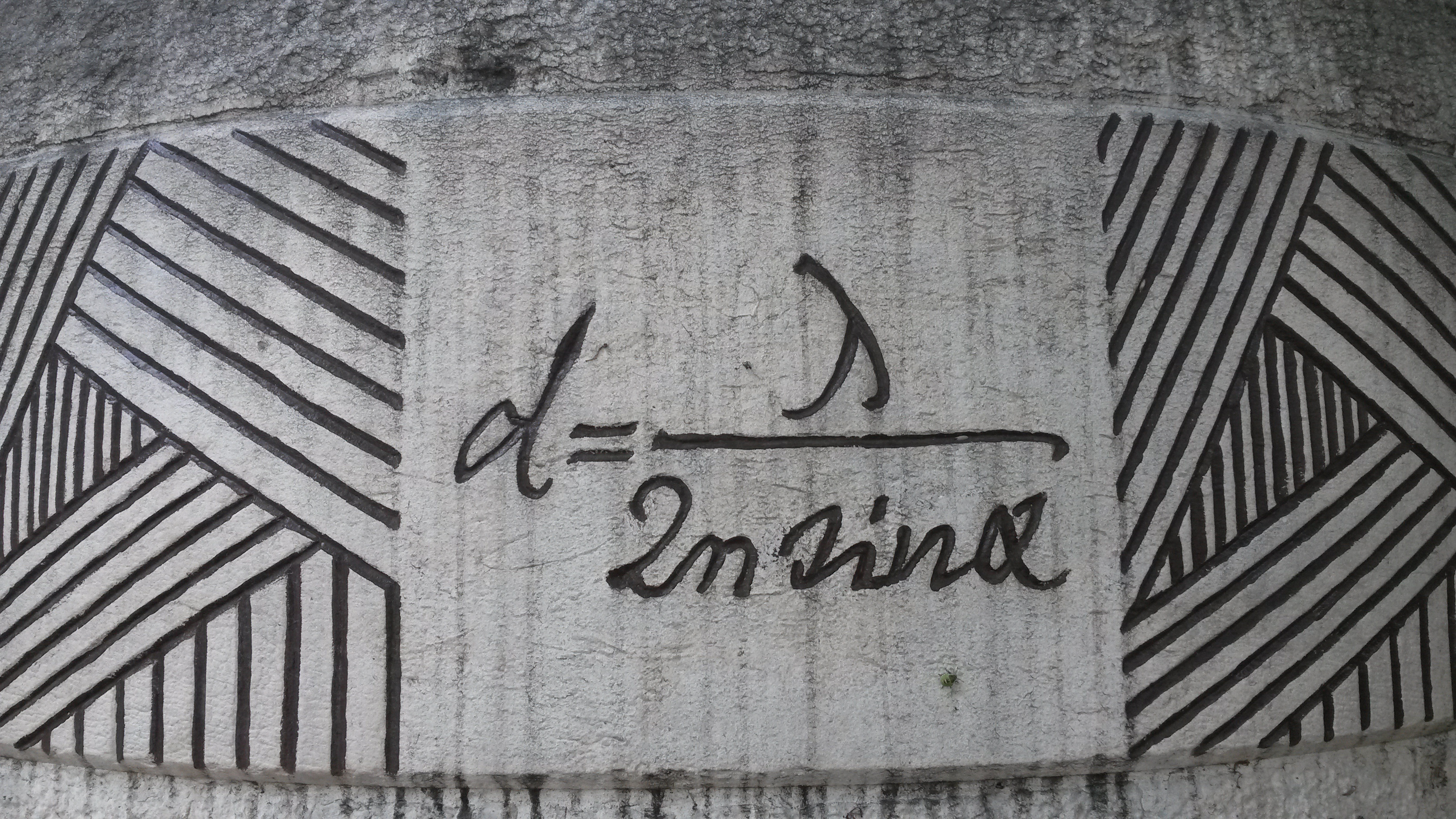
The resolution limit formula engraved in an Ernst Abbe memorial in Jena, Germany

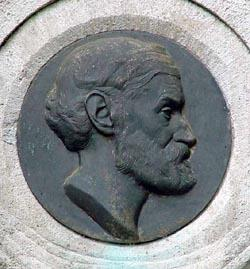
Ernst Abbe, relief at his grave

In 1866, he became a research director at the Zeiss Optical Works, and in 1868 he invented the apochromatic lens, a microscope lens which eliminates both the primary and secondary color distortion. By 1870, Abbe invented the Abbe condenser, used for microscope illumination. In 1871, he designed the first refractometer, which he described in a booklet published in 1874. He developed the laws of image of non-luminous objects by 1872. Zeiss Optical Works began selling his improved microscopes in 1872, including models with homogenous immersion objective by 1877 and his apochromatic objective microscopes in 1886. He created the Abbe number, a measure of any transparent material's variation of refractive index with wavelength and Abbe's criterion, which tests the hypothesis, that a systematic trend exists in a set of observations (in terms of resolving power this criterion stipulates that an angular separation cannot be less than the ratio of the wavelength to the aperture diameter, see angular resolution). Already a professor in Jena, he was hired by Carl Zeiss to improve the manufacturing process of optical instruments, which back then was largely based on trial and error.

Abbe was the first to define the term numerical aperture, as the sine of the half angle multiplied by the refractive index of the medium filling the space between the cover glass and front lens.

Abbe is credited by many for discovering the resolution limit of the microscope, and the formula (published in 1873)

$d = \frac{\lambda}{2 NA}$	Eq. 1

although in a publication in 1874, Helmholtz states this formula was first derived by Joseph Louis Lagrange, who had died 61 years prior. Helmholtz was so impressed as to offer Abbe a professorship at the University of Berlin, which he declined because of his ties to Zeiss. Abbe was in the camp of the wide aperturists, arguing that microscopic resolution is ultimately limited by the aperture of the optics, but also argued that depending on application there are other parameters that should be weighted over the aperture in the design of objectives. In Abbe's 1874 paper, titled "A Contribution to the Theory of the Microscope and the nature of Microscopic Vision", Abbe states that the resolution of a microscope is inversely dependent on its aperture, but without proposing a formula for the resolution limit of a microscope.

In 1876, Abbe was offered a partnership by Zeiss and began to share in the considerable profits. Although the first theoretical derivations of Eq. 1 were published by others, it is fair to say that Abbe was the first to reach this conclusion experimentally. In 1878, he built the first homogenous immersion system for the microscope. The objectives that the Abbe Zeiss collaboration were producing were of ideal ray geometry, allowing Abbe to find that the aperture sets the upper limit of microscopic resolution, not the curvature and placement of the lenses. Abbe's first publication of Eq. 1 occurred in 1882. In this publication, Abbe states that both his theoretical and experimental investigations confirmed Eq. 1. Abbe's contemporary Henry Edward Fripp, English translator of Abbe's and Helmholtz's papers, puts their contributions on equal footing. He also perfected the interference method by Fizeau, in 1884. Abbe, Zeiss, Zeiss' son, Roderich Zeiss, and Otto Schott formed, in 1884, the Jenaer Glaswerk Schott & Genossen. This company, which in time would in essence merge with Zeiss Optical Works, was responsible for research and production of 44 initial types of optical glass. Working with telescopes, he built an image reversal system in 1895.

In order to produce high quality objectives, Abbe made significant contributions to the diagnosis and correction of optical aberrations, both spherical aberration and coma aberration, which is required for an objective to reach the resolution limit of Eq. 1. In addition to spherical aberration, Abbe discovered that the rays in optical systems must have constant angular magnification over their angular distribution to produce a diffraction limited spot, a principle known as the Abbe sine condition. So monumental and advanced were Abbe's calculations and achievements that Frits Zernike based his phase contrast work on them, for which he was awarded the Nobel Prize in 1953, and Hans Busch used them to work on the development of the electron microscope.

During his association with Carl Zeiss' microscope works, not only was he at the forefront of the field of optics but also labor reform. He founded the social democratic Jenaische Zeitung (newspaper) in 1890 and in 1900, introduced the eight-hour workday, in remembrance of the 14-hour workday of his own father. In addition, he created a pension fund and a discharge compensation fund. In 1889, Ernst Abbe set up and endowed the Carl Zeiss Foundation for research in science. The aim of the foundation was "to secure the economic, scientific, and technological future and in this way to improve the job security of their employees." He made it a point that the success of an employee was based solely on their ability and performance, not on their origin, religion, or political views. In 1896, he reorganized the Zeiss optical works into a cooperative with profit-sharing. His social views were so respected as to be used by the Prussian state as a model and idealized by Alfred Weber in the 1947 book Schriften der Heidelberger Aktionsgruppe zur Demokratie und Zum Freien Sozialismus (Writings of the Heidelberg Action Group on Democracy and Free Socialism).

The crater Abbe on the Moon was named in his honour.

== Bibliography ==
Abbe was a pioneer in optics, lens design, and microscopy, and an authority of his time. He left us with numerous publications of his findings, inventions, and discoveries. Below is a list of publications he authored including many links to the scanned Google Books pages.

- Abbe, Ernst (1873). "Über einen neuen Beleuchtungsapparat am Mikroskop" [About a New Illumination Apparatus to the Microscope]. Archiv für mikroskopische Anatomie (in German). 9. Bonn, Germany: Verlag von Max Cohen & Sohn: 469–480. doi:10.1007/bf02956177. S2CID 119495892.
- —— (1873). "Beiträge zur Theorie des Mikroskops und der mikroskopischen Wahrnehmung" [Contributions to the Theory of the Microscope and of Microscopic Perception]. Archiv für Mikroskopische Anatomie (in German). 9 (1). Bonn, Germany: Verlag von Max Cohen & Sohn: 413–468. doi:10.1007/BF02956173. ISSN 0176-7364. S2CID 135526560.
- —— (1874). "Neue Apparate zur Bestimmung des Brechungs und Zerstreuungsvermögens fester und flüssiger Körper" [New Equipment for Determining the Refraction and Dispersion Property of Solids and Liquids]. Jenaische Zeitschrift für Naturwissenschaft (in German). 8. Jena, Germany: Mauke's Verlag: 96–174.
- —— (1875). "A New Illuminating Apparatus for the Microscope". The Monthly Microscopical Journal. 13 (2). London, UK: Robert Hardwicke: 77–82. doi:10.1111/j.1365-2818.1875.tb00845.x.
- —— (1876). Lawson, Henry (ed.). "A Contribution to the Theory of the Microscope and the Nature of Microscopic Vision". Proceedings of the Bristol Naturalists' Society. 1. Translated by Fripp, H. E. London, UK: Williams & Northgate: 200–261.
- —— (1875). —— (ed.). "Extracts from Dr. H. E. Fripp's Translation of Professor Abbe's Paper on the Microscope". The Monthly Microscopical Journal. 14 (4). London, UK: Williams & Northgate: 191–201. doi:10.1111/j.1365-2818.1875.tb00067.x.
- —— (1875). —— (ed.). "Extracts from Dr. H. E. Fripp's Translation of Professor Abbe's Paper on the Microscope (Cont.)". The Monthly Microscopical Journal. 14. London, UK: Williams & Northgate: 245–254. doi:10.1111/j.1365-2818.1875.tb00076.x.
- —— (1878). "Über mikrometrische Messung mittelst optischer Bilder" [About Micrometric Measurement by Means of Optical Images]. Jenaische Zeitschrift für Naturwissenschaft (in German). Jena, Germany: Verlag Von Gustav Fischer: 11–17.
- —— (1878). "Über Blutkörper-Zählung" [About Counting Blood Cells]. Jenaische Zeitschrift für Naturwissenschaft (in German). Jena, Germany: Verlag Von Gustav Fischer: 98–105.
- —— (1878). "Über die Bedingungen des Aplanatismus der Linsensysteme" [The Conditions Under Which Aplanatism of the Lens Systems]. Jenaische Zeitschrift für Naturwissenschaft (in German). Jena, Germany: Verlag Von Gustav Fischer: 129–142.
- —— (1878). "Über die Grenzen der geometrischen Optik" [Beyond the Limits of Geometric Optics]. Jenaische Zeitschrift für Naturwissenschaft (in German). Jena, Germany: Verlag Von Gustav Fischer: 71–109.
- —— (11 June 1879). Crisp, Frank (ed.). "On Stephenson's System of Homogeneous Immersion for Microscope Objectives". Journal of the Royal Microscopical Society. 2 (3). London, UK: Williams & Norgate: 256–265. doi:10.1111/j.1365-2818.1879.tb01651.x.
- —— (1879). —— (ed.). "On New Methods for Improving Spherical Correction applied to the Construction of Wide-angled Object-glasses". Journal of the Royal Microscopical Society. 2 (7). London, UK: Williams & Norgate: 812–824. doi:10.1111/j.1365-2818.1879.tb01548.x.
- —— (2 May 1879). "Über die Bestimmung von Zeit und Polhöhe aus Beobachtungen in Höhenparallen" [The Determination of Time and Latitude Observations Made in Höhenparallen]. Jenaische Zeitschrift für Naturwissenschaft (in German). Jena, Germany: Verlag Von Gustav Fischer: 57–66.
- —— (21 February 1879). "Über die Bestimmung der Brechungs-Verhältnisse fester Körper mittelst des Refractometers" [The Determination of the Refractive Ratios of Solids by Means of Refractometers]. Jenaische Zeitschrift für Naturwissenschaft (in German). Jena, Germany: Verlag Von Gustav Fischer: 35–44.
- —— (1880). Crisp, Frank (ed.). "Conditions on Aplanatism of Systems of Lenses". Journal of the Royal Microscopical Society. 3. London, UK: Williams & Norgate: 509–515.
- —— (1880). —— (ed.). "Some Remarks on the Apertometer". Journal of the Royal Microscopical Society. 3. London, UK: Williams & Norgate: 20–31. doi:10.1111/j.1365-2818.1880.tb05648.x.
- —— (1880). —— (ed.). "Conditions of Aplanatism for Wide-angled Pencils". Journal of the Royal Microscopical Society. 2. 1. London, UK: Williams & Norgate: 831.
- —— (1881). —— (ed.). "The Essence of Homogeneous Immersion". Journal of the Royal Microscopical Society. 2. 1. London, UK: Williams & Norgate: 526.
- —— (1881). —— (ed.). "Illumination for Binocular Microscopes with High Powers". Journal of the Royal Microscopical Society. 2. 1. London, UK: Williams & Norgate: 690–692.
- —— (1881). —— (ed.). "Penetrating Power of Objectives". Journal of the Royal Microscopical Society. 2. 1. London, UK: Williams & Norgate: 831–832.
- —— (1881). "Beschreibung eines neuen stereoskopischen Oculars" [Description of a New Stereoscopic Eye-piece]. Repertorium für Experimental-Physik für Physikalische Technik (in German). 17. Munich, Germany: Druck und Verlag Von R. Oldenbourg: 197–224.
- —— (1881). —— (ed.). "Origin of Homogeneous Immersion". Journal of the Royal Microscopical Society. 2. 1. London, UK: Williams & Norgate: 131–134.
- —— (1881). —— (ed.). "Conditions of Microstereoscopic Vision – "Penetration"". Journal of the Royal Microscopical Society. 2. 1. London, UK: Williams & Norgate: 680–689.
- —— (1881). —— (ed.). "On the Estimation of Aperture in the Microscope". Journal of the Royal Microscopical Society. 1 (3). London, UK: Williams & Norgate: 388–423. doi:10.1111/j.1365-2818.1881.tb05909.x.
- —— (1881). —— (ed.). "On the Conditions of Orthoscopic and Pseudoscopic Effects in the Binocular Microscope". Journal of the Royal Microscopical Society. 2. 1 (2). London, UK: Williams & Norgate: 203–211. doi:10.1111/j.1365-2818.1881.tb05902.x.
- —— (1881). —— (ed.). "Abbe's Stereoscopic Eye-piece". Journal of the Royal Microscopical Society. 2. 1. London, UK: Williams & Norgate: 298–299.
- —— (1882). —— (ed.). "Miniatured Images". Journal of the Royal Microscopical Society. 2. 2. London, UK: Williams & Norgate: 693–696.
- —— (1882). —— (ed.). "The Relation of Aperture and Power in the Microscope". Journal of the Royal Microscopical Society. 2 (3). London, UK: Williams & Norgate: 300–309. doi:10.1111/j.1365-2818.1882.tb00190.x.
- —— (1882). —— (ed.). "The Relation of Aperture and Power in the Microscope (continued)". Journal of the Royal Microscopical Society. 2. 2 (1). London, UK: Williams & Norgate: 460–473. doi:10.1111/j.1365-2818.1882.tb04805.x.
- —— (1883). —— (ed.). "The Relation of Aperture and Power in the Microscope (continued)". Journal of the Royal Microscopical Society. 2. 3 (1). London, UK: Williams & Norgate: 790–812. doi:10.1111/j.1365-2818.1883.tb05956.x.
- —— (1884). —— (ed.). "Note on the Proper Definition of the Amplifying Power of a Lens or Lens-System". Journal of the Royal Microscopical Society. 4 (1). London, UK: Williams & Norgate: 348–351. doi:10.1111/j.1365-2818.1884.tb01110.x.
- —— (1884). —— (ed.). "On the Mode of Vision with Objectives of Wide Aperture". Journal of the Royal Microscopical Society. 4 (1). London, UK: Williams & Norgate: 20–27. doi:10.1111/j.1365-2818.1884.tb02005.x.
- —— (1886). "The new microscope". S Ber Jena Ges Med. 2: 107–108.
- —— (1886). Über Verbesserungen des Mikroscope mit Hilfe neuer Arten optischen Glases [About Enhancements of the Microscope Using New Types of Optical Glass] (in German).
- —— (1890). "Messapparate für Physiker" [Measuring Equipment for Physicists]. Zeitschrift für Instrumentenkunde (in German). 10: 446–447.
- —— (1895). Double Prism for Totally-Reflecting Refractometers. Google Patents.
- —— (1895). Motive und Erläuterungen zum Entwurf eines Statuts der Carl Zeiss-Stiftung [Motives and Explanations on the Draft Statute of the Carl Zeiss Foundation] (in German). Vopelius.
- ——; Rudolph, P. (1897). "Anamorphotisches Linsensystem" [Anamorphic Lens System]. German Pat (in German). 99722.
- —— (1904). Gesammelte Abhandlungen [Collected Essay] (in German). 5 volumes, released from 1904 until 1940. New York, NY: Hildesheim. LCCN 94235187.
- ——; Lummer, Otto; Reiche, Fritz (1910). Die Lehre von der Bildentstehung im Mikroskop [The Theory of Image Formation in the Microscope] (in German). Braunschweig, Germany: F. Vieweg und Sohn. LCCN 10017693.
- —— (1921). Sozialpolitische Schriften [Socio-political Writings] (in German). Jena, Germany: Gustav Fischer. LCCN 49036118.

== See also ==
- Abbe condenser
- Abbe diffraction limit
- Abbe error
- Abbe eyepiece
- Abbe number
- Abbe prism
- Abbe refractometer
- Abbe sine condition
- Abbe–Koenig prism
- Abbe–Porro prism
- Aberration in optical systems
- Crown glass (optics)
- Dermatoscopy
- Diaphragm (optics)
- Calculation of glass properties
- Optical aberration
- Optical dilatometer
- German inventors and discoverers
