= Carl Zeiss =

German optician and optical instrument maker (1816–1888)

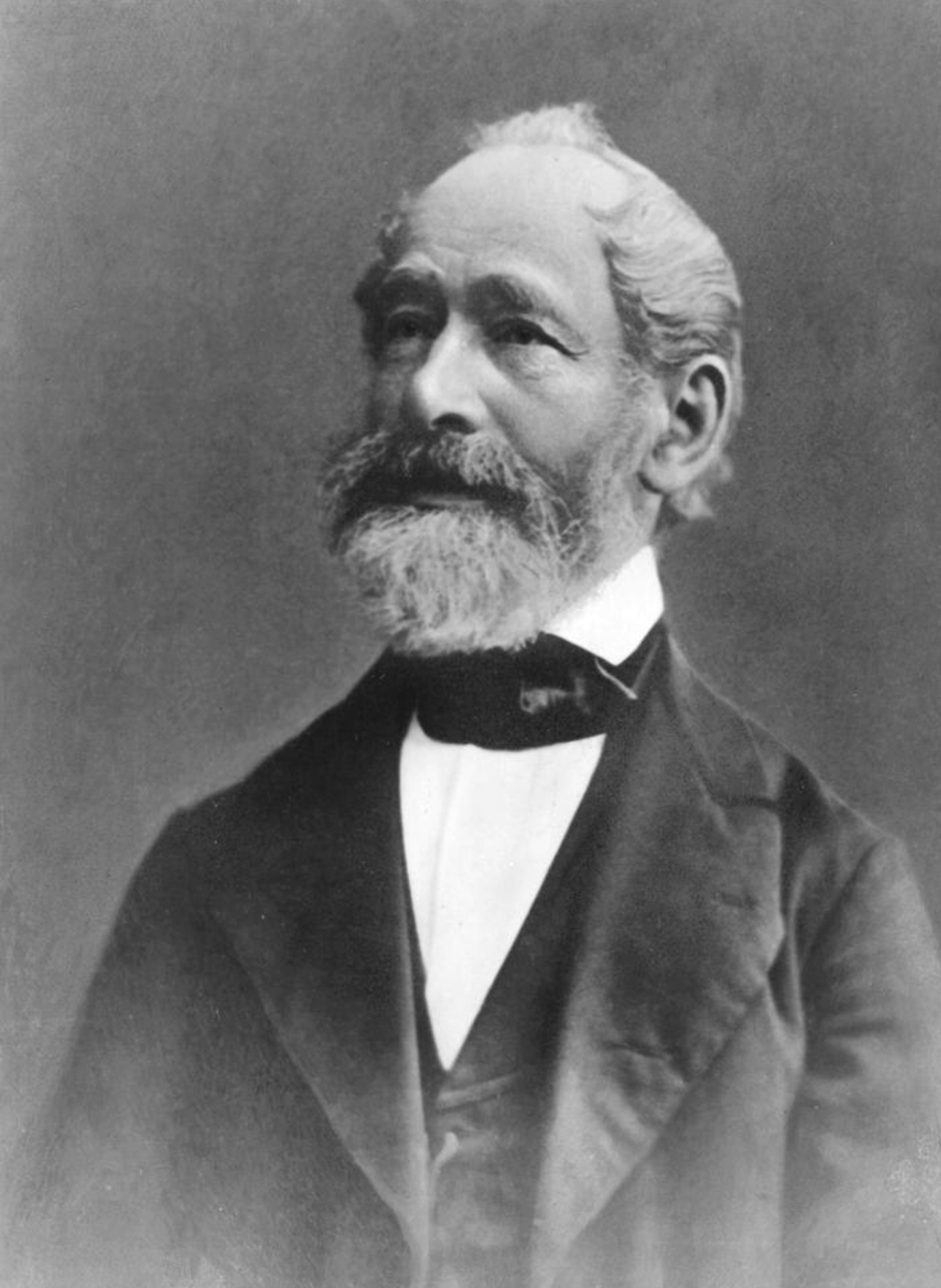
- Born: 11 September 1816; Weimar, Grand Duchy of Saxe-Weimar-Eisenach, German Confederation
- Died: 3 December 1888 (aged 72); Jena, Grand Duchy of Saxe-Weimar-Eisenach, German Empire
- Education: University of Jena
- Known for: Contributions to lens manufacturing Founder of Zeiss
- Scientific career
- Fields: Optics
- Workplaces: Zeiss

Carl Zeiss (German: [kaʁl ˈtsaɪs]; 11 September 1816 – 3 December 1888) was a German scientific instrument maker, optician and businessman. In 1846 he founded his workshop, which is still in business as Zeiss. Zeiss gathered a group of gifted practical and theoretical opticians and glass makers to reshape most aspects of optical instrument production. His collaboration with Ernst Abbe revolutionized optical theory and practical design of microscopes. Their quest to extend these advances brought Otto Schott into the enterprises to revolutionize optical glass manufacture. The firm of Carl Zeiss grew to one of the largest and most respected optical firms in the world.

== Birth and family ==
Carl's father, Johann Gottfried August Zeiss (1785–1849) was born in Rastenberg, where his forefathers had worked as artisans for over 100 years. August moved with his parents to Buttstädt, a small regional capital north of Weimar, where he married Johanna Antoinette Friederike Schmith (1786–1856). Carls Zeiss's mother was related to Christiane Vulpius, the spouse of Johann Wolfgang von Goethe.

August Zeiss then moved to Weimar, the capital of the grand duchy of Sachsen-Weimar-Eisenach, leaving the family business in the hands of his brothers. There he became a well respected ornamental turner, crafting lathe turned work in mother of pearl, amber, ivory, and other exotic materials. He came into contact with the crown prince, and later grand duke, Karl Friedrich of Sachsen-Weimar-Eisenach (1783–1853), the successor to Carl August. The crown prince sought a master to teach him ornamental turning and found one in August Zeiss. The friendship of master and apprentice lasted 40 years. When a son was born to the Zeiss family on 11 September 1816 as the fifth of six surviving children, the newborn son was baptized in honor of his godfather the crown prince and his father the archduke, Carl Friedrich. Of Zeiss's siblings, three sisters and two brothers reached adulthood. Before 1885, the family name was spelled Zeiß.

== Education ==
Higher education was the only path to social mobility at the time and August Zeiss sent all three of his sons to the university preparatory high school, the "Gymnasium", as preparation for the university. The two elder sons studied philology and history and went on to successful careers in education. In one of the accidents which shape history, Carl suffered from an inguinal hernia which required him to wear a truss constantly. The deskbound life of a scholar seemed a poor choice for him. Carl attended the Wilhelm Ernst Gymnasium in Weimar but left early. He sat a special end exam to allow him to study specific subjects at the university, principally the natural sciences.

He showed an interest in technical studies very early, to the extent that he attended lectures at the grand ducal technical school in Weimar and finally decided to pursue an apprenticeship as a master machinist.

Carl moved to Jena at Easter of 1834 to pursue an apprenticeship under the "Hofmechanikus," court-appointed precision machinist, and private docent at the University of Jena, Friedrich Körner (1778–1847). His new master was well known beyond his local university town and his workshop is fairly well documented since he made and repaired instruments for the famous polymath Johann Wolfgang von Goethe. Zeiss remained for four years as an apprentice. For the last two years, he enrolled as a student and attended one mathematics or sciences lecture course per semester at the university, as was his right under his gymnasium certificate. He completed his apprenticeship in 1838 and departed on his journeyman years with the good wishes and recommendation of master Körner and a certificate of his studies at the university.

This was a time when the steam engine and locomotives exercised a powerful draw on young engineers so it is understandable that Carl Zeiss turned his special attention to mechanical engineering. In his travels from 1838 to 1845 he worked in Stuttgart, Darmstadt, Vienna and Berlin. There are few details of these studies, but it appears that he worked for Hektor Rössler, instrument maker and "Hofmechanikus" at Darmstadt. Rössler was involved in optical and scientific instrument production as well as steam power. In Vienna, the center for heavy machinery production in central Europe, he worked for Rollé und Schwilqué. His stay in Vienna also offered the opportunity to attend the Sunday Lectures on popular mechanics at the Polytechnic Institute of Vienna. He also sat for an exam at the institute which he passed with distinction. Finally, in Berlin, he worked in a machinist's shop.

== Early years in Jena ==
After long deliberation Zeiss decided to return to his original subject studied under Körner, construction of experimental scientific apparatus, and set himself up as an independent maker of precision machinery. Zeiss returned to the well known city of Jena to renew an association with the botanist Matthias Jacob Schleiden (1804–1881) who had stimulated his original interest in optics and emphasized the need for high quality microscopes. In addition, his brother Eduard directed the local public school in Jena and had kept him informed on developments in the city.

Realization of the plan required considerable patience in the face of the bureaucracy of the time. He first needed a residence permit, which was easiest to obtain as a matriculated student. Zeiss matriculated and sat lectures on mathematics and chemistry beginning in November 1845. In addition he worked with several professors in the private physiological institute as a technician, building various apparatuses. There was plenty of work despite the fact that there were already two instrument workshops in Jena. In addition to Körner's there was the workshop of Braunau, who had also apprenticed with Körner.

Zeiss finally made his application to the government offices in Weimar for a concession to establish a machinist's atelier in Jena on 10 May 1846. He referred to the increasing demand for scientific apparatus and justified his wish to work in the city with the importance of intimate association with the scientists of the university.

Despite the recommendation of respected professors of the University of Jena, the government in Weimar moved slowly with the request. Zeiss was required to sit a written exam in August and finally, in November, received his "concession for the construction and sale of mechanical and optical apparatus as well as the establishment of an atelier for precision machinery in Jena." After payment of a fee and swearing a ceremonial oath before the Jena authorities, everything was ready.

Zeiss opened the doors of his workshop on 17 November 1846 with an initial capital investment of 100 Talers, which he had borrowed from his brother Eduard and which was later repaid by his father August. By 1849, the workshop earned a profit of 197 Talers on sales of 901 Talers. Zeiss initially worked alone constructing and repairing many types of physical and chemical apparatus. Loupes cut from mirror blanks were particularly in demand. Eyeglasses, telescopes, microscopes, drawing instruments, thermometers, barometers, balances, glassblowing accessories and other apparatuses purchased from foreign suppliers were also sold in a small shop.

In 1847 he began to make simple microscopes which almost immediately met with especially good commercial success. Compared to his competition Vincent Chevalier of Paris, Simon Plössl of Vienna or his mentor Körner, they proved to be not only cheaper, but better. Zeiss microscopes could be focused by moving the column that carried the optics, instead of the object stage. Zeiss's method was more convenient on a dissecting microscope.

Business was so good that he was able to hire an assistant and move to a larger workshop by early 1847. On 1 July 1847 Zeiss took the significant step of taking on his first apprentice, 17 year old August Löber (1830–1912). Löber became one of the most important workers in the Zeiss workshops, becoming a profit sharing partner and staying with Zeiss until his death. A total of 27 simple microscopes were delivered to customers beyond the borders of the grand duchy in 1847. Three difficult years followed with poor harvests, business crisis and revolution in the grand duchy, but by 1850, Zeiss and his microscopes had established a good enough reputation to receive an attractive offer from the University of Greifswald in Prussia. The university's instrument maker Nobert had moved and Zeiss was asked by several members of the faculty to fill the vacancy with an appointment as curator of the physics cabinet with a salary of 200 Talers. Nothing came of the offer, and Zeiss was to remain in Jena for better or worse, when an influential mathematician maintained that such a position should not be filled by a "foreigner."

His sister Pauline kept the household in Jena until Carl Zeiss married a pastor's daughter Bertha Schatter (1827–1850) on 29 May 1849. She died giving birth to his first son in February of the following year. Roderich survived to eventually join his father in the family firm. In May 1853 Zeiss married Ottilie Trinkler, a headmaster's daughter. They had one son, Karl Otto (1854–1925) and two daughters, Hedwig (1856–1935) and Sidonie (1861–1920).

== Carl Zeiss as an employer ==
Zeiss ran his workshop in a strict paternalistic fashion. Microscopes produced by the apprentices which did not meet the strict standards of precision he set were destroyed on the workshop anvil personally by Zeiss. The working hours of the shop were 6 AM until 7 PM. A mid morning break of 15 minutes and a midday break of an hour made for an 11 ¾ hours workday. Despite these strict rules, the working environment in the shop was very good. New recruits to the workshop were interviewed extensively in his home over a glass of wine. The workers were often invited to the gardens of the Zeiss home for wine and refreshments and the workshop paid for the yearly worker's outing to the hills in the hay wagon. His longest serving apprentice Löber earned three Talers per week by 1856 while the other workers earned two and a half.

Zeiss's efforts at improving his knowledge of precision machining and optics meant that a substantial library of books accumulated. These became the machinist's library, available for the further education of any worker.

As the firm expanded, by 1875 the Zeiss health clinic was established, which guaranteed employees free treatment by a clinic doctor and free access to medication. If a worker was unable to work, wages were paid for six weeks with a further six weeks at half wages. These forward thinking policies even precede Otto von Bismarck's state welfare laws introduced in 1883. Worker morale at the Zeiss works was consistently good.

== Improvements of the microscope ==
Production of microscopes in 1846 was a handcraft and art more than manufacturing enterprise. Each worker produced an instrument from start to finish without any division of labor. Early examples were even signed with the maker's name. Only such assemblies which were particularly time-consuming, such as the stage, were prepared in series in advance. The first moves to more efficient division of labor were made in 1857 when Zeiss separated optics under Löber from the metalwork of the stand.

Matthias Jakob Schleiden had been an interested patron and advisor since the founding of the firm, frequently spending hours at the workshops. He advised Zeiss to concentrate his efforts on the microscope which was critical for the rapidly advancing science of cellular anatomy and very much in demand. Schleiden had a personal interest as this was his field of study. As a result of the interaction, the first microscopes products of the workshop, the simple microscopes, were constantly improved. They were very favorably reviewed by the influential microscopist and botanist Leopold Dippel (1827–1914). The optics for the simple microscope included a triplet of 200 fold magnification, for 5 Talers, and one of 300 fold magnification, for 8 Taler. These pushed the limits of the simple microscope. Greater magnification would require compound microscopes. Zeiss would need to expand his offerings so as not to be made irrelevant by his competitors.

Production of compound microscopes required extensive research, which he had foreseen long in advance. Zeiss had developed into something of a bookworm in his limited spare time, researching everything available on theory of the microscope. He wanted, above all, to move past the prevailing methods of microscope production which relied on empirical matching of sets of lenses which would make up the high-magnification compound lenses he needed for compound microscope optics. Empirical methods used a selection of lenses, exchanging and examining elements, altering lens spacings again and again until a usable lens was obtained. Many dozens of lenses could be examined to produce the combination of three elements used in a microscope lens. A reasonably good lens obtained this way was altered and tried again and again to find the best result. To some extent, these designs could be reproduced, but each item was an empirical fit of the small elements which could not be reproduced exactly with the work methods used.

Zeiss was, from the beginning, more a fine machinist than an optician. This meant that he was less constrained by the traditional work methods and thinking of contemporary opticians and more open to innovation. He decided to pursue the design of microscope optics by theoretical calculation, which expert opinion considered impossible for various reasons. Despite that opinion, Joseph von Fraunhofer (1787–1826) had already produced telescope objectives by calculation in 1819, and Josef Maximilian Petzval had done the same for the camera objective in Vienna with Johann Friedrich Voigtländer in 1840. Zeiss had already attempted to acquire the required theory in his evening literature studies. When this failed, he turned to the Jena professor of mathematics, Friedrich Wilhelm Barfuss, who had worked with his mentor Körner and had already worked successfully on the problem of Zeiss's simple microscope triplets. The collaboration continued until the professor's death, but offered no progress on the compound microscope problem.

Zeiss's first compound microscopes were offered in his 5th, 1858, price list. These are described as "Small body tube, consisting of a field lens and two oculars with an adaptor to attach the tube to the stand and doublet objectives of stands 1 through 5 to allow use of the doublets as objectives to obtain two stronger magnifications after the fashion of the compound microscope. The 120 power doublet of the simple microscope yields in this fashion 300 and 600 fold magnification."

Despite Schleiden's approval, these improvised compound microscopes were not a long-term solution. A similar arrangement, as a Brücke's Loupe, continued to be offered for many years with the dissecting stands but the original simple microscope doublets were an inferior substitute for a purpose designed compound microscope achromatic objective. By the publication of the 7th, 1861, price list in August 1861, newly developed compound microscopes appear in 5 different versions. The largest of these, costing 55 Taler, was a horseshoe foot stand as made popular by the well known Parisian microscope maker Georg Oberhaeuser. Under the object stage Zeiss introduced a domed aperture plate and a mirror mounted to allow not only side to side, but also forward movement to produce oblique illumination. Each microscope suite was produced to order for his customers so that they could choose their preferred optical components; objectives, oculars and illumination.

The objectives for these new compound microscopes were still empirically design but nonetheless met with immediate approval from Leopold Dippel. Dippel examined the optical quality of the most useful objectives, A, C, D and F and had considerable praise for Zeiss's new objectives. The D objective was compared very favorably with the similar power objectives of Belthle and Hartnack (successor to Oberhaeuser). The F objective is even described as the equal of much more expensive objectives from established makers. It is assessed as almost as good as Hartnack's water immersion objectives. That was, of course the problem. When selling to researchers at the forefront of their fields, "almost as good" is a commercial disaster. Zeiss knew quite well that his strongest objectives could not match the quality of the Hartnack water immersion objectives. Every attempt to empirically design a satisfactory water immersion objective had failed.

== Collaboration with Ernst Abbe ==
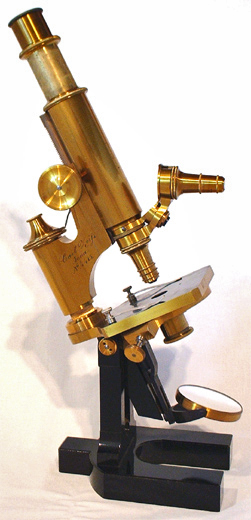
Large microscope by Carl Zeiss (1879)

To solve his problem Zeiss returned to his original plans to design his objectives based on a calculated theoretical basis. He renewed his search for a collaborator and this time chose Ernst Abbe (1840–1905), a private docent, or associate professor, at the university. The official collaboration between the 50 year old Zeiss and 26 year old Abbe began in July 1866 with the goal of the creation of a water immersion objective with resolution equal to those of Emil Hartnack's.

A first step in the rational production of optics was a modernization of the workshop methods. This was accomplished with some resistance from Löber and the other employees who preferred to remain with their traditional methods. The plan was to measure every individual property of each lens element before an objective was constructed to allow precise reproduction of the optical system. The D objective, for example contained 5 lenses. Each was composed of glass with a specific index of refraction, with exact curvatures, of a specific focal length and exact spacings. Löber had already investigated one requirement using glass reference gauges to compare the curvature of lens surfaces using the phenomenon of Newton's rings. Fraunhofer had arrived at the same solution long before but the procedure had remained a trade secret of his workshop. Abbe constructed a series of new measuring apparatus to measure focal lengths and refractive indices. The result of all of this effort was clear by 1869. Outwardly the microscopes had hardly changed, but due to the rationalization of the work flow more microscopes were produced with the same personnel. Prices were reduced by 25%.

Abbe could now proceed with the actual task, namely calculation of the theoretical objective designs. Zeiss provided him every possible support from the workshop and the assistance of the most capable worker of the workshop, namely August Löber. Despite this, there were many obstacles to overcome. It was 1872 before the work was complete. Abbe had recalculated the existing A through F objectives for systematic production and added four new, larger aperture, objectives AA through DD in this series. Most important, he added three water immersion objectives with resolution and image quality equalling anything available from Hartnack, Gundlach or other competitors. In catalog number 19, Microscopes and Microscopical Accessories, it was announced that, "The microscope systems presented here are all constructed on the basis on the recent theoretical calculations of Professor Ernst Abbe of Jena." They were no longer surpassed by any competitor's products. This was also reflected in the prices. While the best microscope cost 127 Taler in 1871, in 1872 one paid 387 Taler for the top of the line. Despite this, business remained brisk and the new objective system garnered high praise at a conference of natural scientists and physicians in Leipzig.

Zeiss repaid Abbe for his endeavor with a generous profit sharing arrangement in the workshops and made him a partner in 1875. As one condition of his financial participation Abbe was obligated not to expand his responsibilities at the university further. The optical calculations were specifically regarded as property of the firm and not to be published, contradicting Abbe's original plans.

== Expansion of the workshop into a major concern ==
On 14 October 1876 the completion of the 3,000th microscope was celebrated and the staff had grown to 60 employees. That same year Zeiss's son Roderich joined the firm, assuming commercial and administrative duties and becoming a partner in 1879. In addition Roderich made important contributions in the design of microphotographic apparatus. Carl Zeiss remained active in the firm on a daily basis. In recognition of his contributions Carl was awarded an honorary doctorate by the faculty of the university of Jena in 1880 at the recommendation of a long-term collaborator, the zoologist Prof. Ernst Häckel.

A move to modernization and enlargement of the firm was encouraged by Ernst Abbe, while Zeiss remained somewhat more conservative based on the many setbacks he had experienced. Nonetheless, by the 1880s the transition to large scale operations was underway.

By 1883 the firm was enjoying solid business success. The firm published its catalog No 26 as an illustrated and bound volume of 80 pages in an edition of 5,000 copies. The always thrifty Zeiss required retailers to share the cost of three or four silver groschen per copy. The firm's retailer in London, Baker, often ordered 40 or more objectives at a time. The firm even began opening field offices in and outside the country.

== Optical glass ==
After mastering the problem of producing objectives based on theoretical calculation one problem remained, namely the production of suitable optical glass. At the time optical glass was obtained from England, France or Switzerland and left much to be desired in quality, reliable availability, selection of optical properties and prompt delivery. The optical properties were not consistent from batch to batch and, as important, those glasses which could be obtained were not ideal for the properties calculated to give the best correction in a microscope objective.

Abbe and Zeiss were convinced that the optical qualities of the microscope objective could be improved further if glasses with certain properties could be obtained. Unfortunately, no such glasses existed. Zeiss once again supported Abbe in his theoretical work with the resources of the workshop to produce objectives using liquids in lens triplets to test his theory by 1873, known as polyop objectives in the workshop. Liquid lens triplets were not a new idea. David Brewster describes them in his Treatise on the Microscope of 1837 for the Encyclopædia Britannica. They allow access to several optical properties which are not accessible in glasses. Unfortunately, they are not commercially viable. These expensive and commercially useless experiments proved that Abbe's prediction was correct. Superior optical corrections were possible. Abbe and Zeiss's 1872 series of objectives, including the water immersion objectives, were as good as anything made at the time. For the first time, these objectives were better than anything made anywhere. This result provided the argument for developing new glasses.

Abbe discussed the problem of expanding the range of properties of optical glasses with the major producers with no success, but he continued to search for a way forward. Zeiss and Abbe responded very enthusiastically to the enquiries of the chemist and glass technician Otto Schott when Schott contacted Abbe to seek help characterizing new chemical compositions in glasses. Schott was uniquely skilled at producing small batches of experimental glass compositions in high quality. He was convinced to move to Jena and expand his experiments. After demonstrating dozens of successful experiments, Zeiss used his credibility and connections to obtain financial support from the Prussian government for the efforts. Within two years of the establishment of a glassworks in Jena, Zeiss, Abbe and Schott could offer dozens of well characterized optical glasses with repeatable composition and on large scale. The firm still operates as Schott AG.

In the same publications announcing the Schott glassworks line of products, Zeiss announced a new set of objectives, based on Abbe's work, corrected to a higher standard than any existing lenses. The apochromatic objectives represented the success of collaborations lasting almost two decades.

== Later years and death ==
In December 1885 Zeiss suffered a mild stroke, from which he fully recovered. The grand duke enrolled him in the Order of the White Falcon for his 70th birthday in 1886, the same year the apochromatic objectives appeared on the market. These represented the final realization of the grand design for the theoretical design of objectives inspired by and made possible by Zeiss and realized by Abbe; they delivered previously unknown image quality. The members of the congress of Russian physicians were so inspired by the new objectives that they made Zeiss an honorary member.

Zeiss was able to attend the celebration on the occasion of the completion of the 10,000th microscope on 24 September 1886, to which all employees and their spouses were invited. It was a lavish party remembered in Jena for decades. Zeiss suffered a rapid decline and, after several strokes in the last quarter of 1888, died on 3 December 1888. Zeiss is buried in Jena.

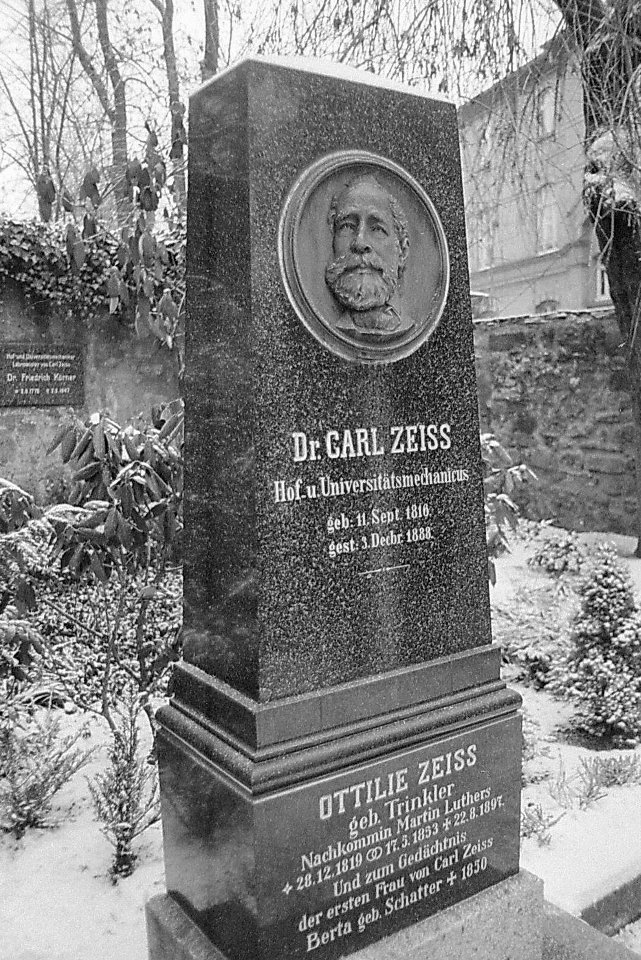
Zeiss's grave

In final analysis of the contributions of Carl Zeiss one must conclude that, although he introduced several improvements in the mechanics of the microscope, he did not personally introduce groundbreaking innovations. His critical contributions were his insistence on the greatest precision in his own work and in the products of his employees and that he maintained from the beginning close contacts with the scientists who gave him valuable insights for the design of his microscopes.

The contribution of Zeiss was in his pursuit of his idea to produce objectives based on theory, even when his own efforts and those of Barfuss had failed. Even though the final task was accomplished by Abbe and not himself, one credits Zeiss with awakening Abbe's interest in optics and providing every support for the enormous task. The production of an objective based on theoretical design was possible with skilled artisans trained to work with the highest possible precision, upon which Zeiss had always placed the greatest emphasis.

One final accomplishment was guiding the internal reorganization and transformations of a workshop into a major enterprise. Only this transformation made it possible to produce microscopes in large numbers with highest precision. The driving force behind the expansion was Ernst Abbe, but Zeiss had the final say and supported the efforts to the fullest. Competing workshops which did not embrace the calculation of optical systems and the transition to major enterprises were doomed to fail.

Ernst Abbe honored the contributions of Carl Zeiss in several major speeches and created a memorial with the foundation of the Carl Zeiss Foundation, Carl-Zeiss-Stiftung, which still endures today.

== Remembrances ==
The football club FC Carl Zeiss Jena is named after him.

== Publication ==
- Felix Auerbach: The Zeiss works and the Carl-Zeiss stiftung in Jena, 2nd edition 1904

== See also ==
- Calculation of glass properties - a significant contribution to the success of the companies Zeiss and Schott
- Optical Museum Jena
- Zeiss projector
- Planetarium
- List of planetariums
