= Carl-Zeiss-Stiftung =

German foundation

Carl Zeiss Foundation
- Formation: 1889; 137 years ago
- Founder: Ernst Abbe
- Headquarters: Stuttgart, Germany
- Managing Director: Felix Streiter
- Website: www.carl-zeiss-stiftung.de

The Carl-Zeiss-Stiftung (Carl Zeiss Foundation), legally located in Heidenheim an der Brenz and Jena, Germany, and with its administrative headquarters in Stuttgart, is the sole shareholder of the two companies Carl Zeiss AG and Schott AG. It was founded by Ernst Abbe in 1889 and named after his long-term partner Carl Zeiss. The products of these companies include the classic areas of optics and precision mechanisms, as well as glass (including optical glass), optoelectronics, and glass ceramics. The statutes of the foundation emphasize the social responsibility of the companies and the importance of a fair treatment of the employees.

In fiscal year 2007/2008 more than 30,000 people were employed by the foundation's companies and their subsidiaries, with total sales of over 4.9 billion Euros.

== Founding ==
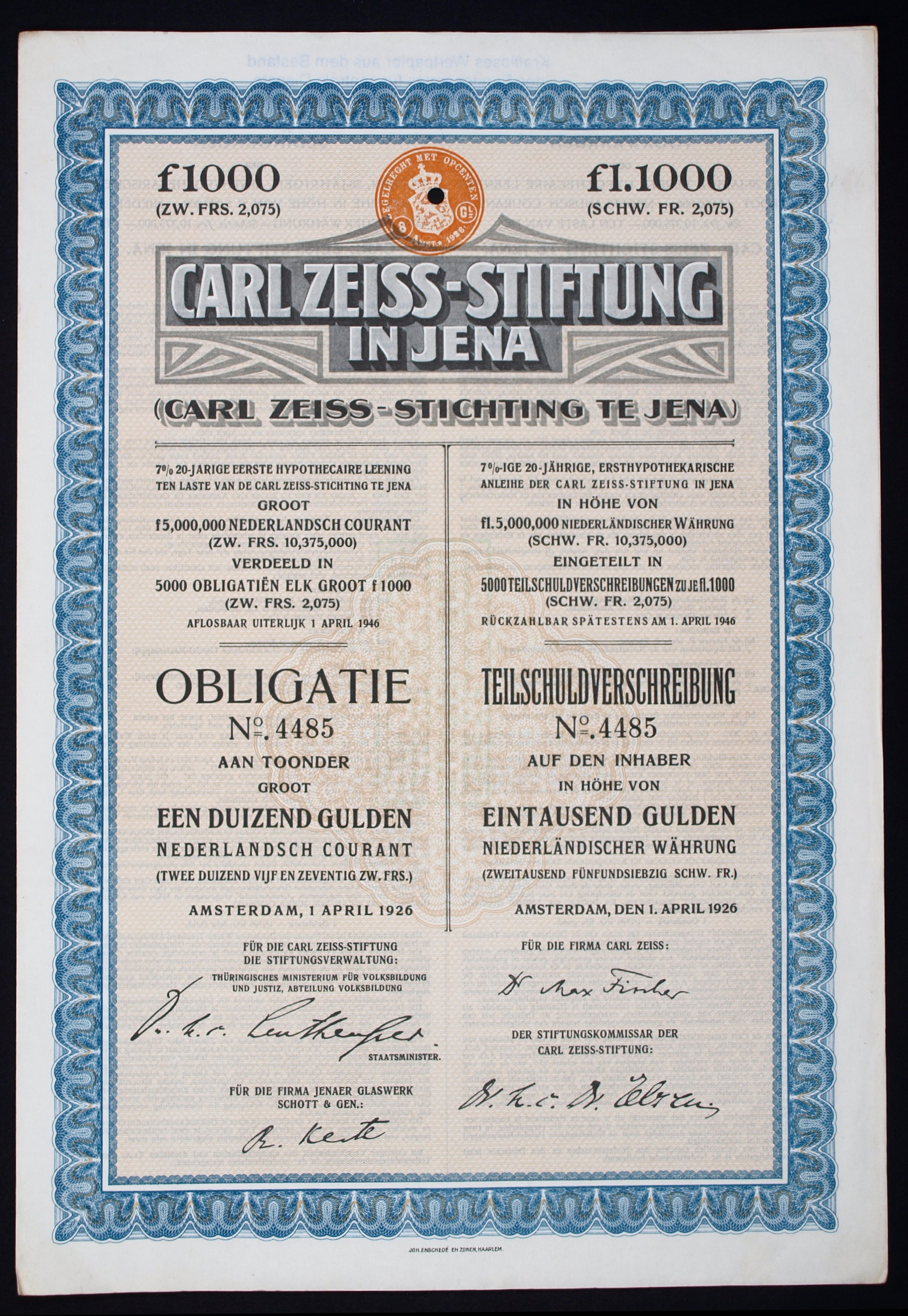
Bond of the Carl Zeiss-Stiftung, issued 1 April 1926

The Carl-Zeiss-Stiftung was founded by the German physicist and mathematician Ernst Abbe. He named it after his late business partner and friend Carl Zeiss, who died in 1888. The deed of foundation dates from 19 May 1889. On 21 May establishment of the foundation was approved by the Grand Duchy of Saxe-Weimar-Eisenach, making it a legal entity. Originally Abbe had intended to transfer his interests in the companies Carl Zeiss and Jenaer Glaswerk Schott & Genossen to the University of Jena, feeling that he had the University to thank for his rise to wealthy entrepreneur. He established the Ministerial Fund for Scientific Purposes in 1886 for this reason; through the fund, he annually donated substantial sums anonymously to the University. In addition, he financed the construction of a University Observatory in 1889 out of his private funds.

The gift of his shares to the University, as originally intended, was not legally possible. Working with representatives of the Sachsen-Weimar state government, the idea of a foundation was formed. The Carl-Zeiss-Stiftung was founded in 1889; Ernst Abbe turned over his shares in these firms, as well as those of Roderich Zeiss, Carl Zeiss's son, to the foundation by 1891. In 1919 Otto Schott also donated his shares to the foundation, giving it the sole proprietorship of the glass works, as well. The act of incorporation lasted until 1896; an amendment governing grants to the University, followed in 1900.

In Paragraph 1 of this act of incorporation lays down the following general purposes of the foundation:

- Economic security of both firms owned by the foundation
- Social responsibility to the employees
- Advancing the interests of precision industries
- Involvement in community facilities for the good of the working people of Jena
- Advancing natural and mathematical science in research and teaching

The act also includes rules of organization of the foundation, particularly regarding the foundations divisions, business operations, and questions of social and labor law. The legal establishment and enforceability of workers' rights were notable for the time, visionary, and trend-setting. The peculiarity of the original legal structure of the Carl-Zeiss-Stiftung was its definition as a business entity, rather than its current form as holding company. The foundation was thus the manager of both of its companies, rather than holder of ownership of independent companies. The foundation was governed by the Culture Ministry of Weimar; from there came the foundation's "commissar", who led the management of the businesses. The foundation's board was appointed by its management. The first commissar was Carl Rothe (until 1896), followed by Max Vollert who remained in office until 1911. Then Friedrich Ebsen occupied the office until 1933.
