= Egyptian faience =

Type of Ancient Egyptian sintered-quartz ceramic

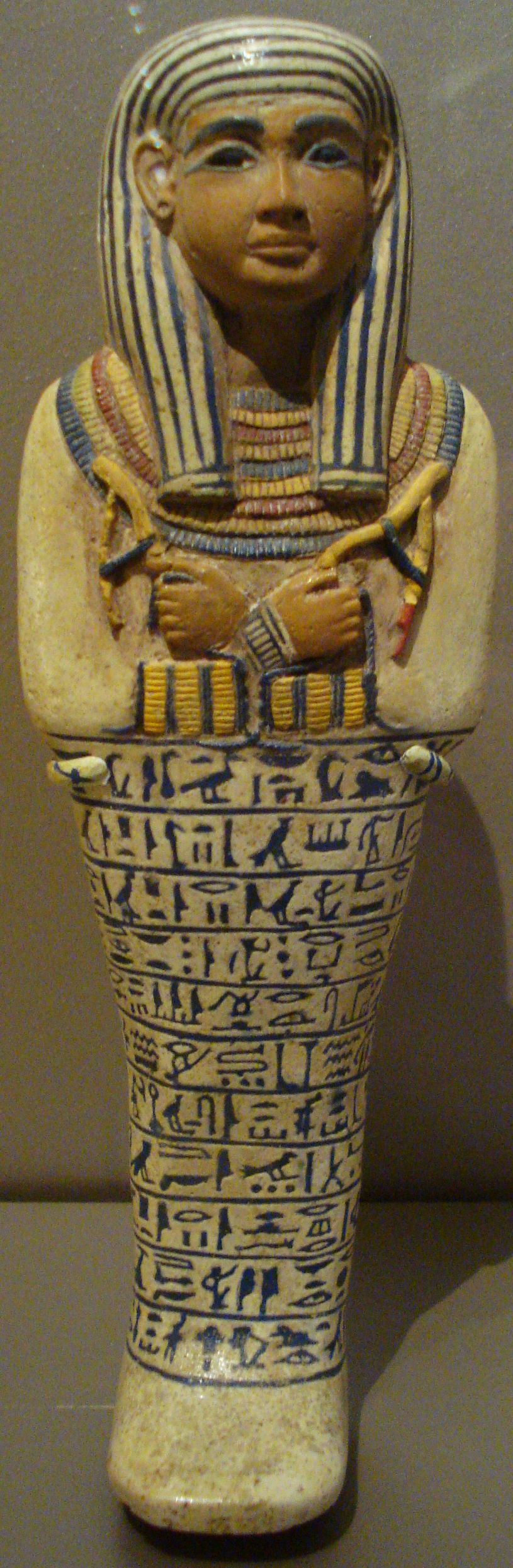
Egyptian faience ushabti of Lady Sati. New Kingdom, Dynasty XVIII, reign of Amenhotep III, c. 1390–1352 BC. Possibly from Saqqara.

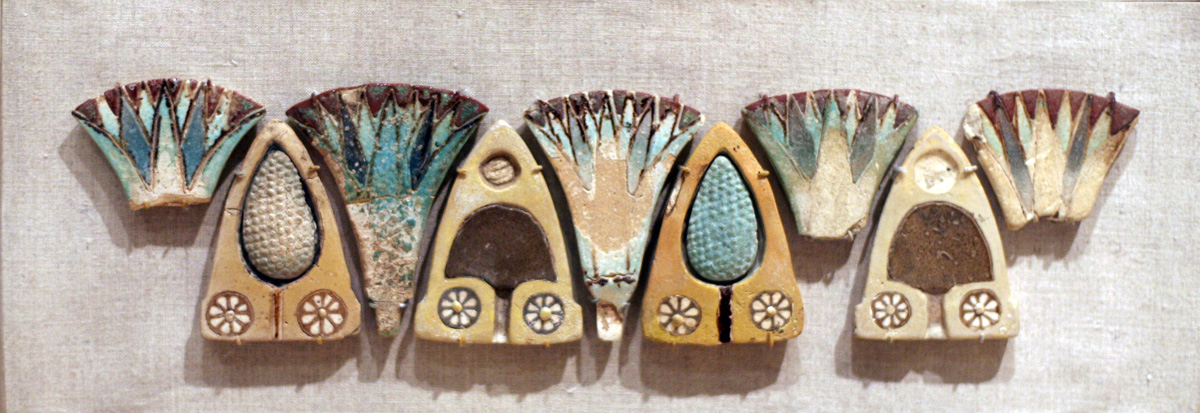
Tile frieze with lotus and grapes

Egyptian faience is a sintered-quartz ceramic material from Ancient Egypt. The sintering process covered the material with a true vitreous coating as the quartz underwent vitrification, creating a bright lustre of various colours usually in a transparent blue or green isotropic glass. Its name in the Ancient Egyptian language was tjehenet, literally "the gleaming" or "the dazzling", and modern archeological terms for it include sintered quartz, glazed frit, and glazed composition. Tjehenet is distinct from the crystalline pigment Egyptian blue, for which it has sometimes incorrectly been used as a synonym.

It is not faience in the usual sense of tin-glazed pottery, and is different from the enormous range of clay-based Ancient Egyptian pottery, from which utilitarian vessels were made. It is similar to later Islamic stonepaste (or "fritware") from the Middle East, although that generally includes more clay.

Egyptian faience is considerably more porous than glass proper. It can be cast in molds to create small vessels, jewelry and decorative objects. Although it contains the major constituents of glass (silica, lime) and no clay until late periods, Egyptian faience is frequently discussed in surveys of ancient pottery, as in stylistic and art-historical terms, objects made of it are closer to pottery styles than ancient Egyptian glass.

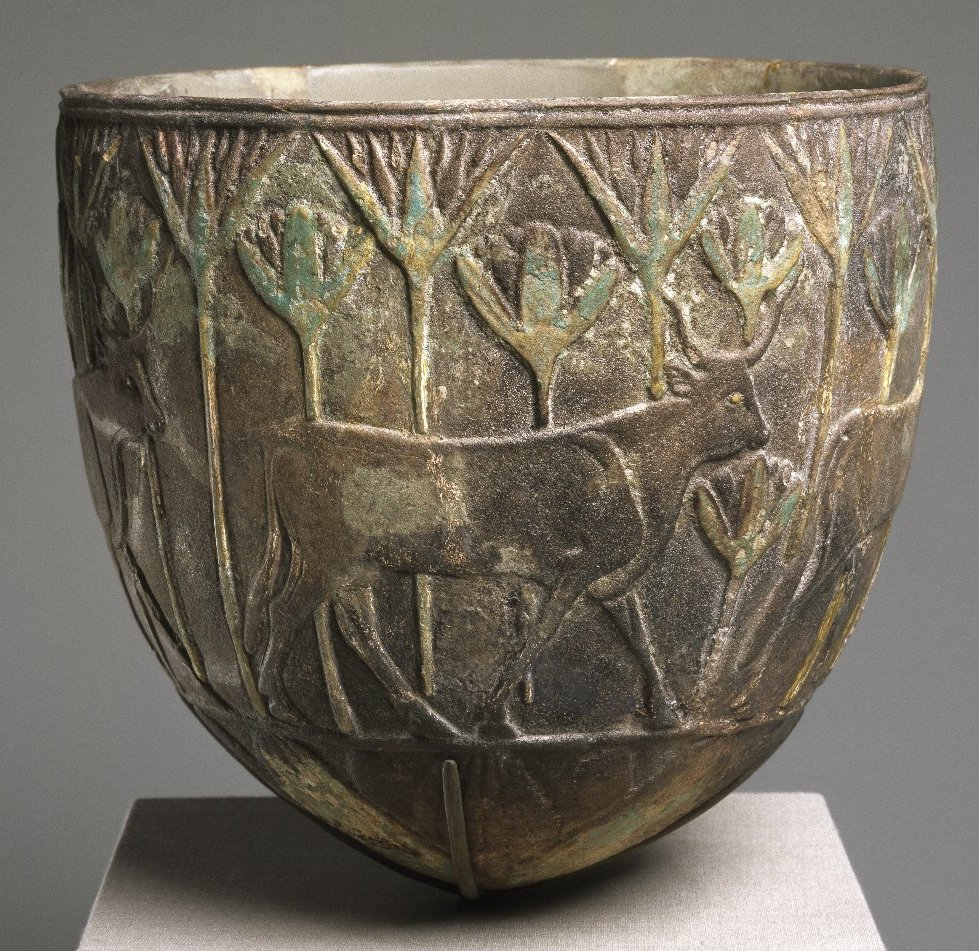
Faience vessel with procession of four bulls, c. 775–653 BCE Brooklyn Museum

Egyptian faience was very widely used for small objects, from beads to small statues, and is found in both elite and popular contexts. It was the most common material for scarabs and other forms of amulet and ushabti figures, and it was used in most forms of ancient Egyptian jewellery, as the glaze made it smooth against the skin. Larger applications included dishware, such as cups and bowls, and wall tiles, which were mostly used for temples. The well-known blue hippopotamus figurines, placed in the tombs of officials, can be up to 20 cm (7.9 in) long, approaching the maximum practical size for Egyptian faience, though the Victoria and Albert Museum in London has a 215.9-centimetre (85.0 in) sceptre, dated 1427–1400 BC.

== Scope of the term ==
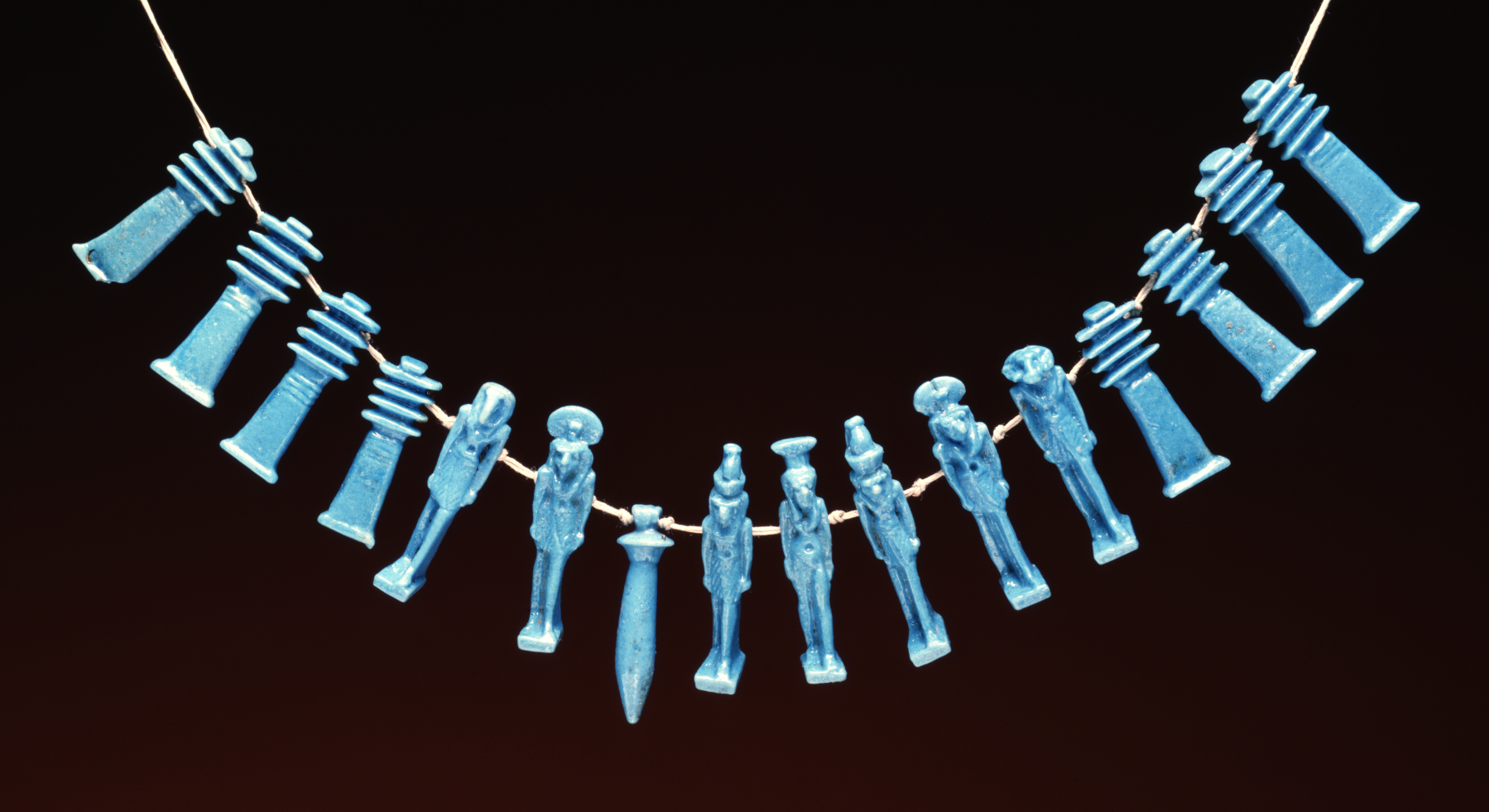
Group of 16 amulets strung as a necklace, in the typical bright faience blue, Late Period

It is called "Egyptian faience" to distinguish it from faience, the tin-glazed pottery whose name came from Faenza in northern Italy, a center of maiolica (one type of faience) production in the late Middle Ages. Egyptian faience was both exported widely in the ancient world and made locally in many places, and is found in Mesopotamia, around the Mediterranean and in northern Europe as far away as Scotland. The term is used for the material wherever it was made and modern scientific analyses are often the only way of establishing the provenance of simple objects such as the very common beads.

The term is therefore unsatisfactory in several respects, although clear in an Ancient Egyptian context, and is increasingly rejected in museum and archaeological usage. The British Museum now calls this material "glazed composition", with the following note in their online collection database:

The term is used for objects with a body made of finely powdered quartz grains fused together with small amounts of alkali and/or lime through partial heating. The bodies are usually colourless but natural impurities give them a brown or greyish tint. Colourants can also be added to give it an artificial colour. It can be modelled by hand, thrown or moulded, and hardens with firing. This material is used in the context of Islamic ceramics where it is described as stonepaste (or fritware). Glazed composition is related to glass, but glass is formed by completely fusing the ingredients in a liquid melted at high temperature. This material is also popularly called faience in the contexts of Ancient Egypt and Ancient Near East. However, this is a misnomer as these objects have no relationship to the glazed pottery vessels made in Faenza, from which the faience term derives. Other authors use the terms sintered quartz, glazed frit, frit, composition, Egyptian Blue, paste or (in the 19th century) even porcelain, although the last two terms are very inappropriate as they also describe imitation gems and a type of ceramic. Frit is technically a flux.

== Glazes ==
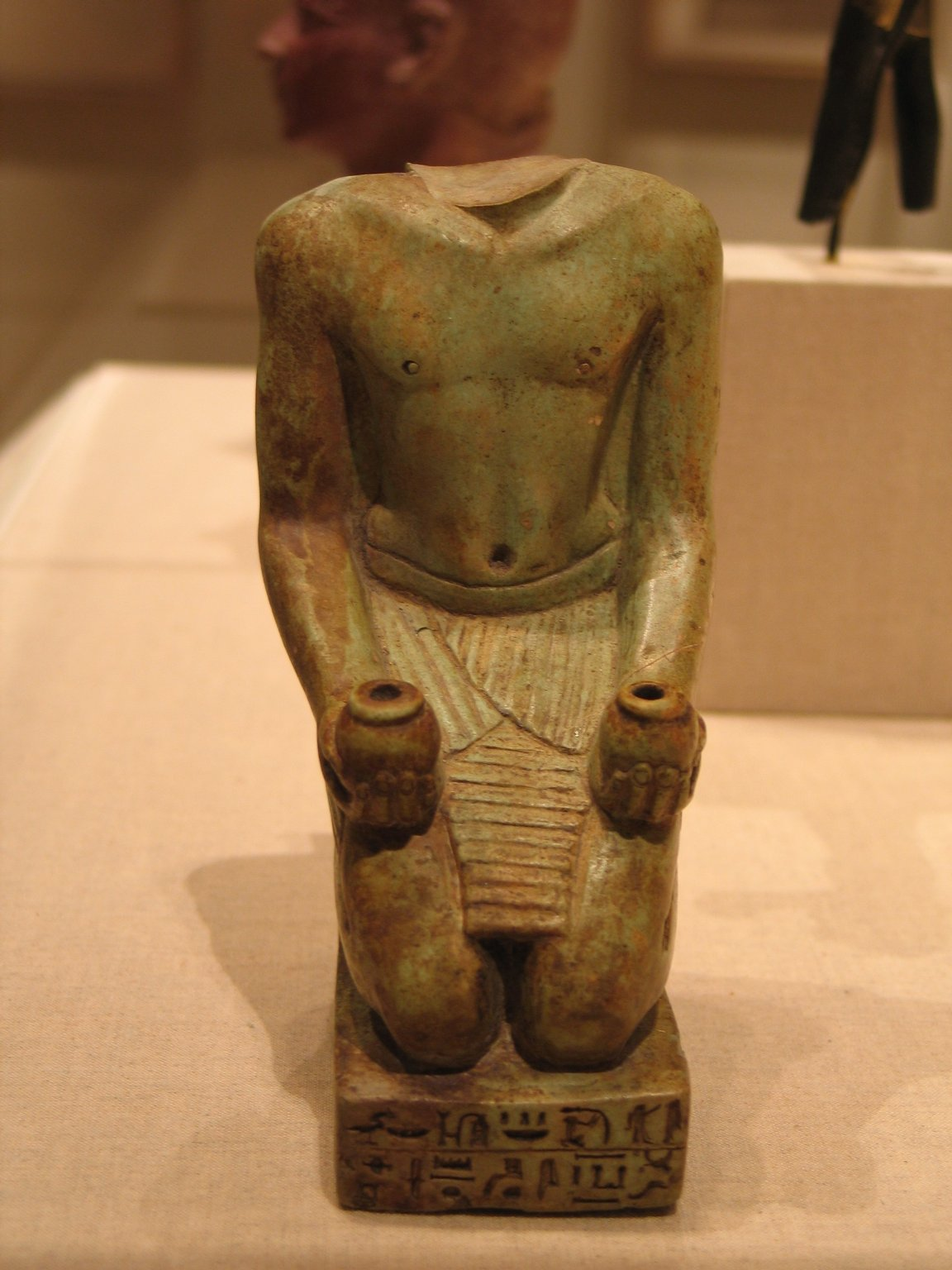
Kneeling Statue of Nesbanebdjedet, ca. 755-730 BC, now 13.8 cm high

From the inception of faience in the archaeological record of Ancient Egypt, the elected colors of the glazes varied within an array of blue-green hues. Glazed in these colours, faience was perceived as substitute for blue-green materials such as turquoise, found in the Sinai Peninsula, and lapis lazuli from Afghanistan. According to the archaeologist David Frederick Grose, the quest to imitate precious stones "explains why most all early glasses are opaque and brilliantly colored" and that the deepest blue color imitating lapis lazuli was likely the most sought after. As early as the Predynastic graves at Naqada, Badar, el-Amrah, Matmar, Harageh, Avadiyedh and El-Gerzeh, glazed steatite and faience beads are found associated with these semi-precious stones. The association of faience with turquoise and lapis lazuli becomes even more conspicuous in Quennou's funerary papyrus, giving his title as the director of overseer of faience-making, using the word which strictly means lapis lazuli, which by the New Kingdom had also come to refer to the 'substitute', faience. The symbolism embedded in blue glazing could recall both the Nile, the waters of heaven and the home of the gods, whereas green could possibly evoke images of regeneration, rebirth and vegetation.

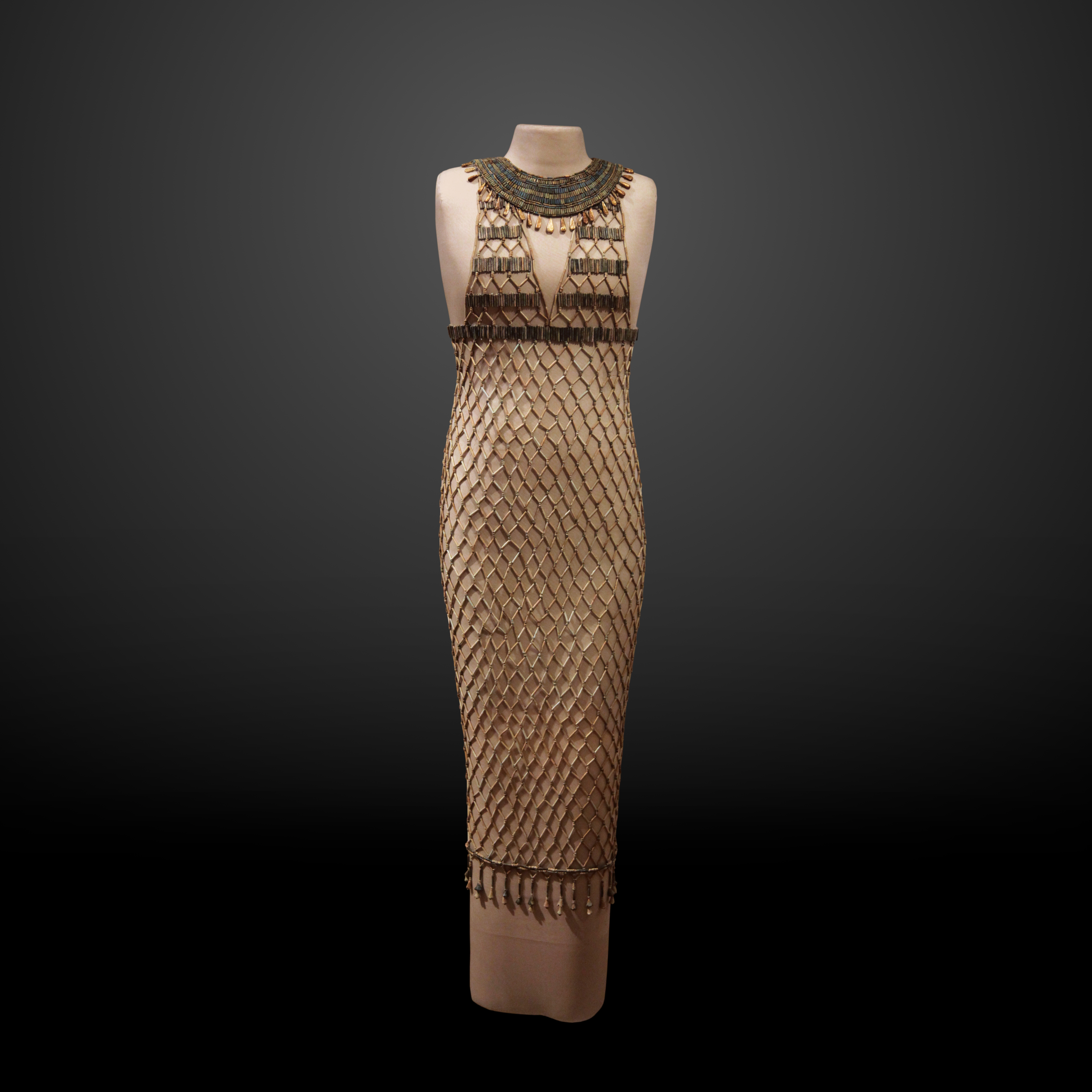
Egyptian faience beaded fishnet dress dating from the Fourth Dynasty of Egypt.

=== Relationship with Egyptian copper industry ===
The discovery of faience glazing has tentatively been associated with the copper industry: bronze scale and corrosion products of leaded copper objects are found in the manufacture of faience pigments. However, although the likelihood of glazed quartz pebbles developing accidentally in traces in copper smelting furnaces from the copper and wood ash is high, the regions in which these processes originate do not coincide.

=== Relationship with Egyptian glass industry ===
Although it appears that no glass was intentionally produced in Egypt before the Eighteenth Dynasty (as the establishment of glass manufacture is generally attributed to the reign of Thutmose III), it is likely that faience, frit and glass were all made in close proximity or in the same workshop complex, since developments in one industry are reflected in others. Such close relationship is reflected in the prominent similarity of the formulations of faience glaze and contemporary glass compositions. Despite the differences in the pyrotechnology of glass and faience, faience being worked cold, archaeological evidence suggests that New Kingdom glass and faience production was undertaken in the same workshops.

== Production ==
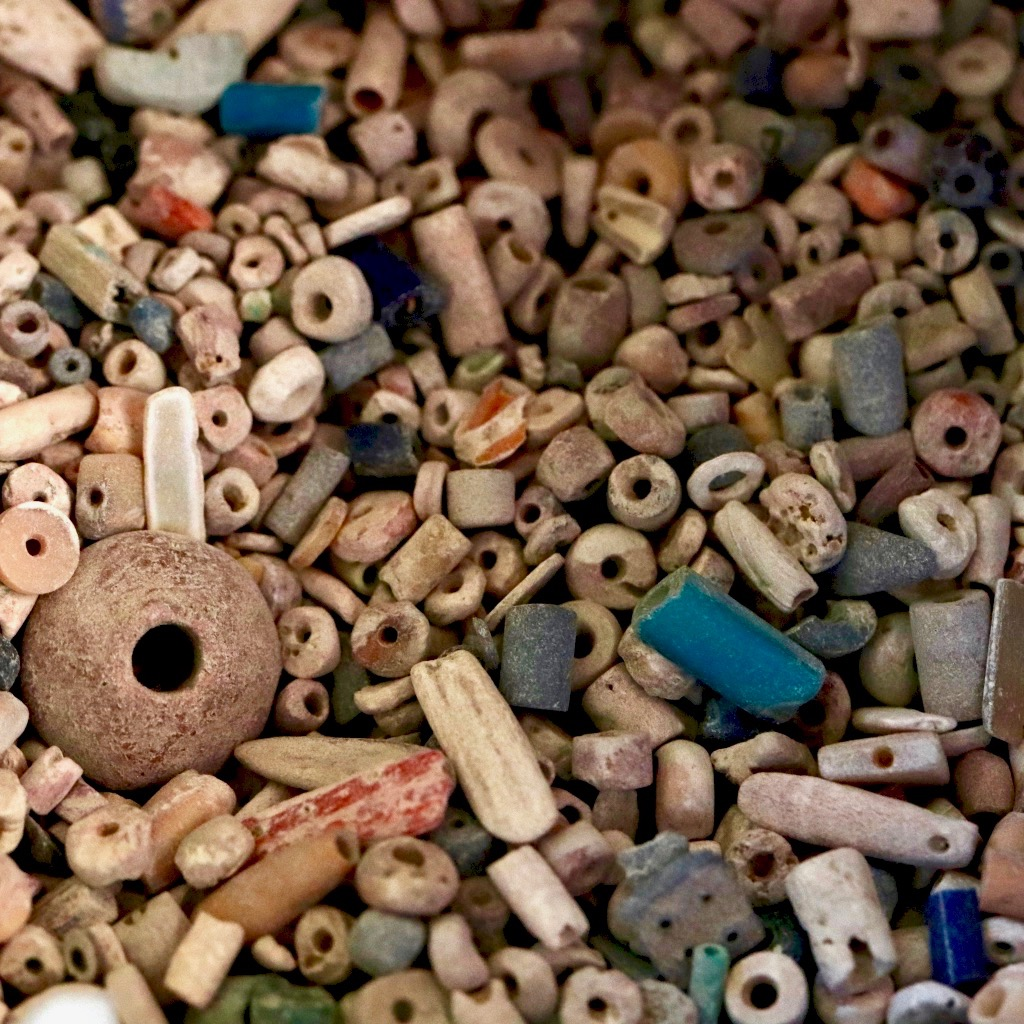
Assortment of Egyptian faience beads

=== Typical composition and access to raw materials ===
Faience has been defined as the first high technology ceramic, to emphasize its status as an artificial medium, rendering it effectively a precious stone. Egyptian faience is a non-clay based ceramic composed of crushed quartz or sand, with small amounts of calcite lime and a mixture of alkalis, displaying surface vitrification due to the soda lime silica glaze often containing copper pigments to create a bright blue-green luster. While in most instances domestic ores seem to have provided the bulk of the mineral pigments, evidence suggests that during periods of prosperity, raw materials not available locally, such as lead and copper, were imported. Plant ash, from "halophyte" (salt-tolerant) plants typical of dry and sea areas, was the major source of alkali until the Ptolemaic Period, when natron-based alkalis almost completely replaced the previous source. Although the chemical composition of faience materials varies over time and according to the status of the workshop, also as a cause of change of accessibility of raw materials, the material constitution of the glaze is at all times consistent with the generally accepted version of faience glazing.

=== Faience working technology ===
Typical faience mixture is thixotropic, that is thick at first and then soft and flowing as it begins to be formed. This property, together with the angularity of silica particles, accounts for the gritty slumps formed when the material is wetted, rendering faience a difficult material to hold a shape. If pressed too vigorously, this material will resist flow until it yields and cracks, due to its limited plastic deformation and low yield strength.

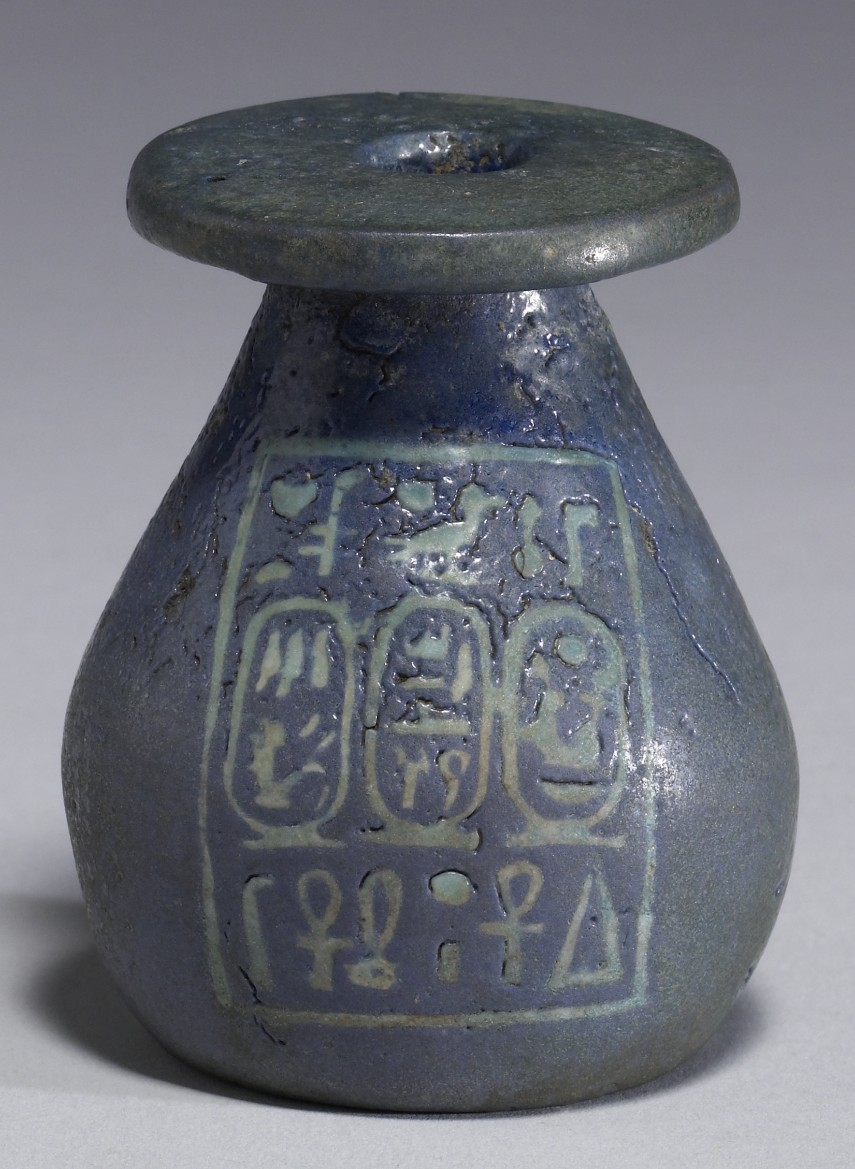
This faience vessel from the reign of Amenhotep III exhibits two different shades of blue that can be achieved by adding cobalt and copper pigments to faience paste. Walters Art Museum, Baltimore.

=== Body binding technology ===
A number of possible binding agents, amongst Arabic gum, clay, lime, egg white and resin, have been suggested to help in the binding process. Although traces of clay have been found in most Pharaonic faience, reconstruction experiments showed that clay, organic gums or lime while successfully improving the wet working performance, failed to improve the fired strength of the faience, or proved the gum was too sticky for the removal of objects from their molds. The use of alkalis as binders, in the form of natron or plant ash, produced suitable results in experiments. Pulverized glass or sintered material of similar composition could also enhance the fired strength of faience bodies: the compositions of such glasses is in fact comparable to the published compositions of New Kingdom glass.

=== Body working technology ===
Three methods have been hypothesized to shape the body of faience objects: modeling, moulding and abrasion, the last being used in conjunction with the first two. Modeling, scraping and grinding are the techniques most widely believed to have been used in earlier times, as represented in the material qualities of Predynastic and Protodynastic faience objects. Predynastic bead manufacture was essentially a cold technology, more akin to stone working than glass with a general form being modeled from faience material, possibly free formed by hand, which would have holes drilled to create beads.

During the Middle Kingdom, common techniques used for faience bead making were molding and forming on a core. This period also marked the emergence of marleized faience, which was created from working different colored faience materials together in a way that produced a uniformed final substance with striated color layers. Towards the end of the Middle Kingdom, incising, inlaying and resisting techniques came into use and would become progressively more popular towards the beginning of the New Kingdom.

In the New Kingdom, beads, amulets and finger rings were produced by a combination of modeling and molding techniques. In this period, sculptural detail was created using inlays of different colored faience or by scraping the body to reveal the white intermediate layer in relief. Moulding was first applied to faience manufacture in the Middle Kingdom by forming a model of an object, or employing a finished faience piece, impressing it in wet clay, and later by firing the clay to create a durable mold. The faience paste could then be pressed into the mold, and following drying, be re-worked through surface abrasion before firing. Moulds could facilitate mass production of faience objects such as amulets rings and inlays, as evidenced by the several thousand of small open face, earth-ware clay molds excavated at Tell el Amarna. The level of standardisation that use of moulds produced varied, with a compositional and morphological study of faience ushabtis suggested that mass-production is an oversimplification of a complex process that may more accurately described as batch-processing.

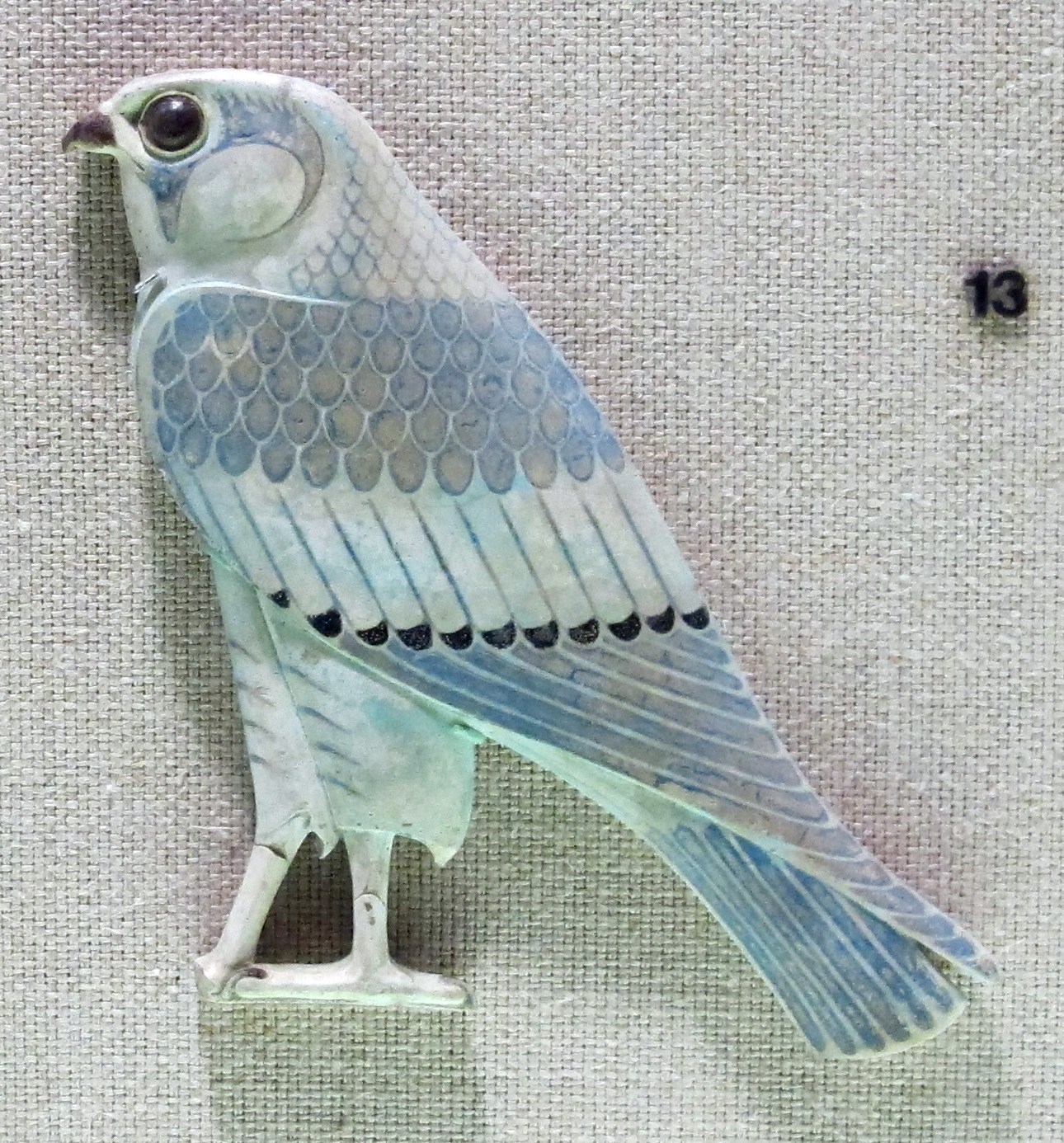
Falcon, Ptolemaic period, 13.5 cm high, from the Metropolitan Museum of Art collection

Wheel throwing was established by at least the Greco-Roman period, though it may have been occurring from the New Kingdom onwards, when large amounts of clay seem to have been added to the faience body. Throwing faience would have been extremely difficult given the limited plasticity of the material, and it's adoption has resulted in a progressive increase of clay incorporated into the faience bodies culminating in the quartz, clay and glass frit bodies of Islamic times, is observed in the archaeological record.

Ptolemaic and Roman faience tends to be typologically and technologically distinct from the earlier material, and is recognizable for its widespread incorporation of moulding and high relief on faience artifacts from those settings. One example of this faience work is seen in the collection of finely made figures of deities and falcons from the Ptolemaic Period which are currently held in the Metropolitan Museum of Art in New York. These figures appear to represent not the deities themselves necessarily, rather they appear to represent the hieroglyphs that are elements from a royal inscription and may have been intended to be displayed in a specific order to represent the name or names of specific royal figures. These pieces were decorated in a form of champlevé (typically a technique for enamel on metal). Depressions in the faience body were filled with coloured "vitreous pastes" and refired, followed by polishing.

Polychrome pieces were usually made by inlaying different colours of paste.

== Glazing technology ==
The technology of glazing a siliceous body with a soda lime silica glaze employs various methods discovered over time: namely application, efflorescence and cementation glazing.

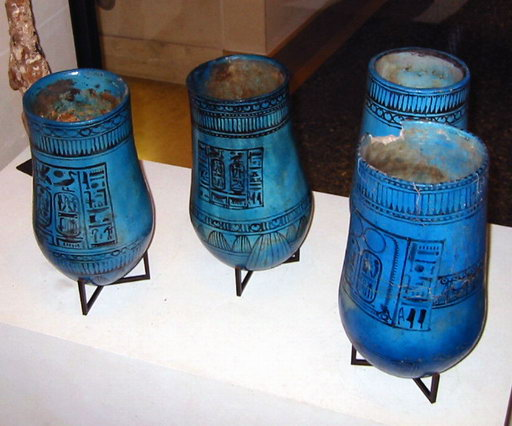
Vases probably used for the funeral of Rameses II

=== Application glazing ===
In the application method, formerly assumed to be the only one used for faience glazing; silica, lime and alkalis are ground in the raw state to a small particle size, thus mixed in water to form a slurry which is then applied to the quartz core. Partial fritting of the slurry favors the first stages of vitrification, which in turn lowers the final firing temperature. The slurry can be then applied to the body, through brushing or dipping, to create a fine, powdery coating. Upon firing, the water from the melting glaze partially diffuses in the sand body, sintering the quartz particles and thus creating some solid bridges in the body.

=== Efflorescence glazing ===
In the self-glazing process of efflorescence, the glazing materials, in the form of water-soluble alkali salts, are mixed with the raw crushed quartz of the core of the object. As the water in the body evaporates, the salts migrate to the surface of the object to recrystallize, creating a thin surface, which glazes upon firing.

=== Cementation glazing ===
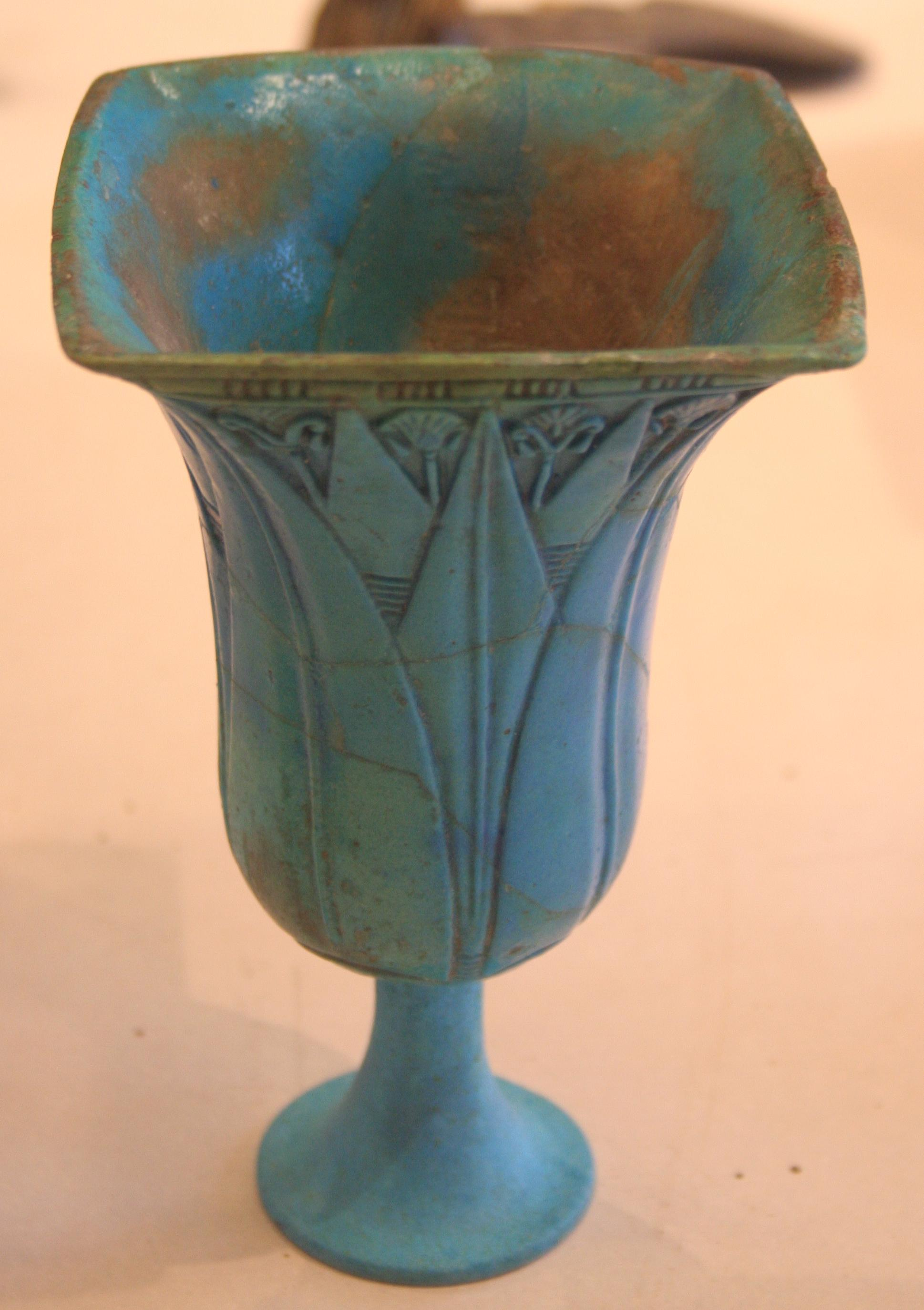
Cup with lotus decoration, 14.4 cm high

Cementation glazing, a technique discovered in the Middle Kingdom, is also a self-glazing technique. The possibility of the existence of cementation glazing, also known as 'Qom technique', followed the observation of this method being used in the city of Qom in Iran in the 1960s. In this method the artifact, while buried in a glazing powder with a high flux content, is heated inside a vessel, causing the fusion of the object with the cement. During firing, the flux migrates to the quartz and combines with it to form a glassy coating.

=== Alternative techniques ===
A vapour glaze reaction similar to salt glazing, as an alternative glazing process, has been suggested. In this process, the vaporization or dissociation of salts leads to vapour transport through the enveloping powder to the quartz body where a glaze is formed.

=== Recognition of glazing techniques ===
Although glaze compositions vary regionally and chronologically, depending on the formation of the body and the glazing process employed, objects produced with different glazing techniques do not exhibit immediate diagnostic chemical variations in their compositions. The recognition of the various glazing techniques, through microscopic observations of the degree of sintering and the vitreous phase of quartz body, is also ambiguous. For instance, objects with applied glazes and those which may have been glazed by efflorescence have overlapping characteristic features. The following proposed criteria are subject to variation caused by increases in flux concentration, firing temperatures and time at peak temperatures.

Recognition of application glazing- Macroscopically, applied glazes vary in thickness through the body, displaying thicker glazes on bases. The traces of kiln supports, as well as the characteristic tendency to run and drip leading to pooling, may indicate the orientation of the object during firing. In high magnification observations, the interface boundary of body and glaze appears well defined. The absence of interstitial glass in the core is characteristic of application glazing: however, the possibility of adding glazing mixture to the quartz sand body, as well as the use of pre-melted glazes in the later periods, can predictably increase the degree of sintering of the core.

Recognition of cementation- Objects glazed through cementation display a thin even glaze all over the body, with no drying or firing marks, and portray a fairly friable and soft body. Microscopically, the concentration of copper characteristically decreases from the surface: the interaction layer is thin and well defined and the interstitial glass is absent with exception to the vicinity of the boundary layer.

Recognition of efflorescence glazing- Pieces glazed by efflorescence may show traces of stand marks: the glaze appears thick and prone to cracking, thinning toward the edge of the piece and in concave areas. In high magnification the interstitial glass is extensive; the unreacted salts which have not reached the surface fuse of the body accumulate in the core, creating bridges between the quartz particles.

== Typologies ==
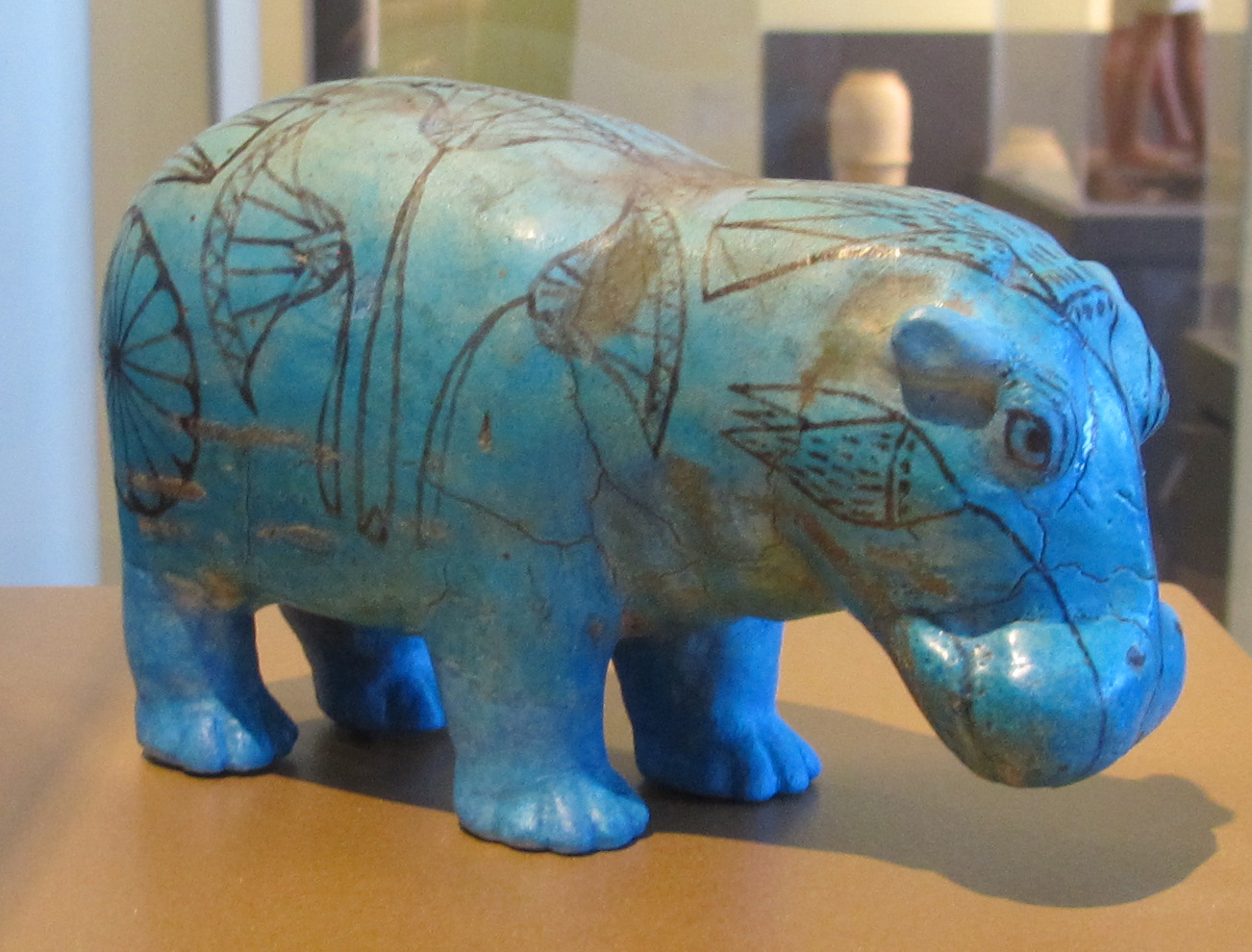
Hippopotamus figure for a tomb, Middle Kingdom

An extensive literature has accumulated in attempt to explain the processing of Egyptian faience and develop an adequate typology that encompasses both technological choices and chemical variations of faience bodies. Body color, density and luster provided the basis of the first typology developed for faience: seven variants were proposed by Lucas and Harris and still permit the archaeologist to distinguish faience objects during field sorting.

=== Classification of body variants ===
Most of the seven variants introduced by Lucas fail to recognize the glazing technology utilized or to suggest the stylistic and technological choices embedded in the manufacture of a faience object. However, variant A describes a technologically unique product and as such is still applicable: it has a finely ground underglaze consisting of quartz particles in a glass matrix, often revealed by incisions or depressions cut into the overlying glaze. Glassy faience, variant E, displays no distinct outer layer from the interior, thus it has been suggested that the term 'faience' is a misnomer and the alternative name 'imperfect glass' has been advised. Regarding variant F specimens, Lucas suggests the use of lead glazes, however it appears that lead glazing was never practiced in Ancient Egypt.

== Workshop evidence ==
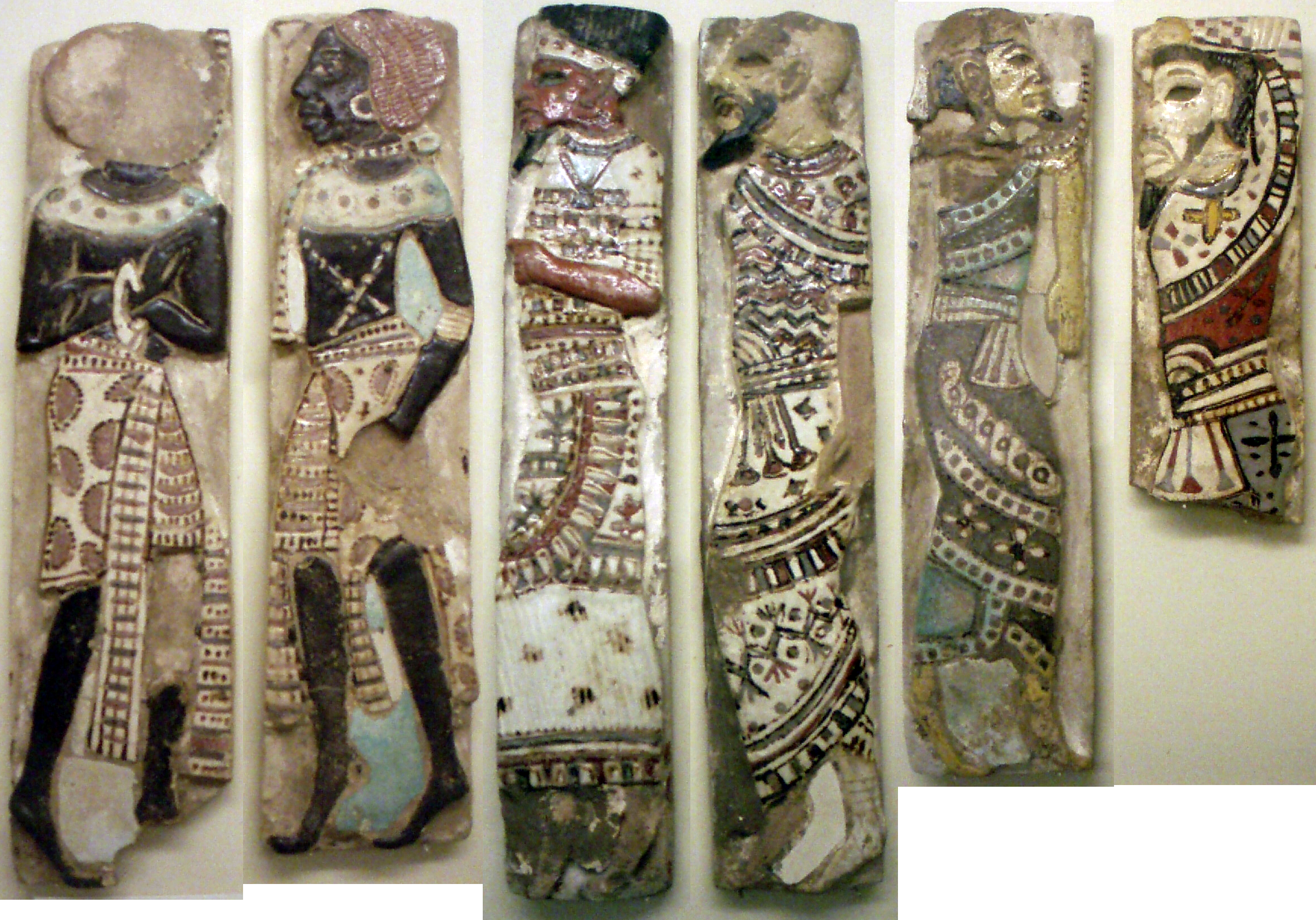
Ramesses III prisoner tiles: Inlay figures, faience and glass, of "the traditional enemies of Ancient Egypt" from a royal palace of Ramesses III (1182-1151 B.C.), at the Museum of Fine Arts, Boston. From left: 2 Nubians, Philistine, Amorite, Syrian, Hittite

While several potential sites of former faience workshops have been proposed by archaeologists, there have been no confirmed workshops found during excavation of ancient Egyptian sites. Although excavations at the archaeological sites of Abydos and Amarna in the 1990's along with earlier remains excavated at sites in Lisht, Memphis and Naukratis have helped to build some picture of the faience crafting processes throughout Egyptian history, there is still no clear understanding of how glass furnaces were differentiated from faience kilns, which makes confirmation of faience workshop impossible at this time. Replication experiments, using modern kilns and replica faience pastes, indicate that faience is fired in the range of 800–1000 °C

== Current use ==
A number of ceramists are experimenting with Egyptian faience, though some of the compositions bear only a passing resemblance to the original Egyptian formulae. There has also been a recent interest in the use of Egyptian faience in 3-d printing technology. It may be possible to fire faience-like materials in a microwave.

== Gallery ==
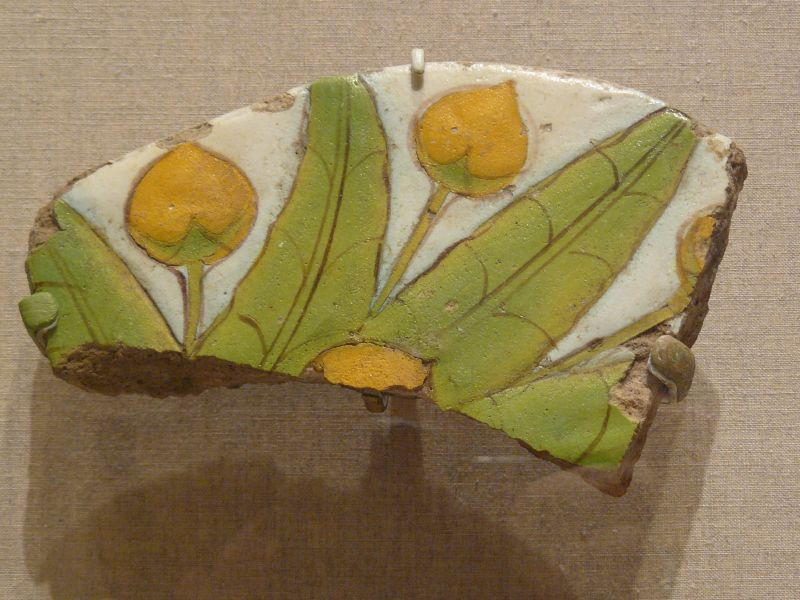
Floral inlay on tile fragment, Brooklyn Museum

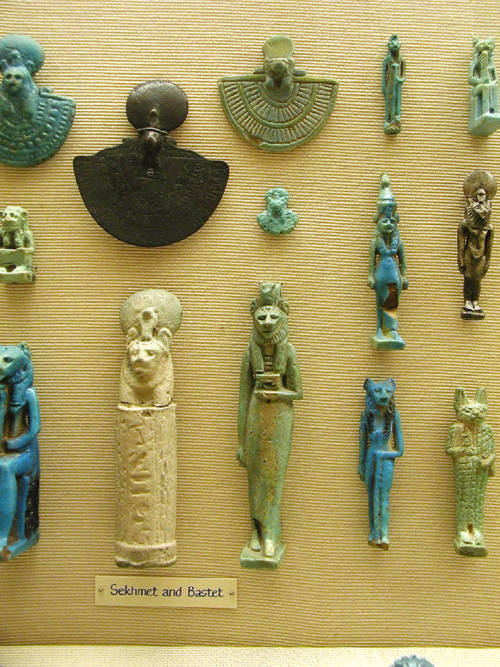
Selection of amulets of Sekhmet and Bastet

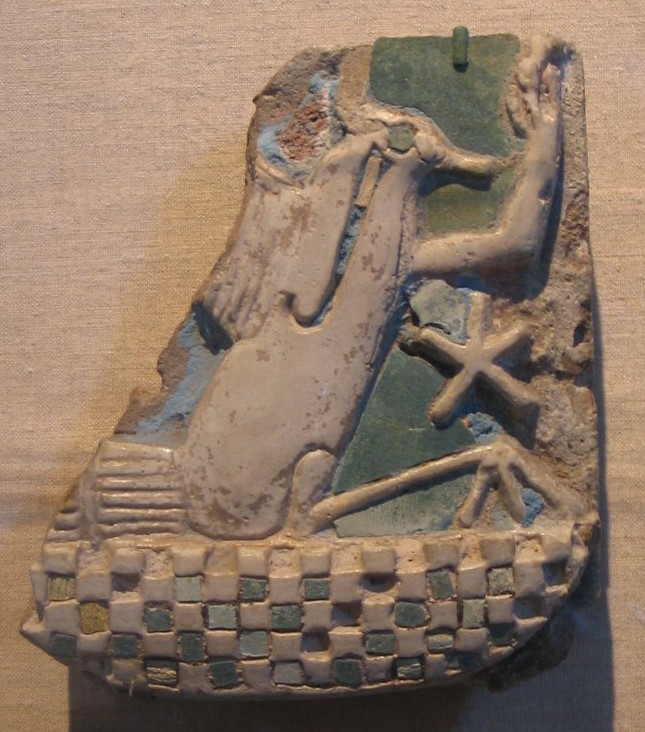
ca. 1539-1070 BC, 33.578. Inlaid faience tile with rebus, "All the people of the world adoring". Probably from a palace of Ramesses II or III. Height: 11.5 cm, Brooklyn Museum

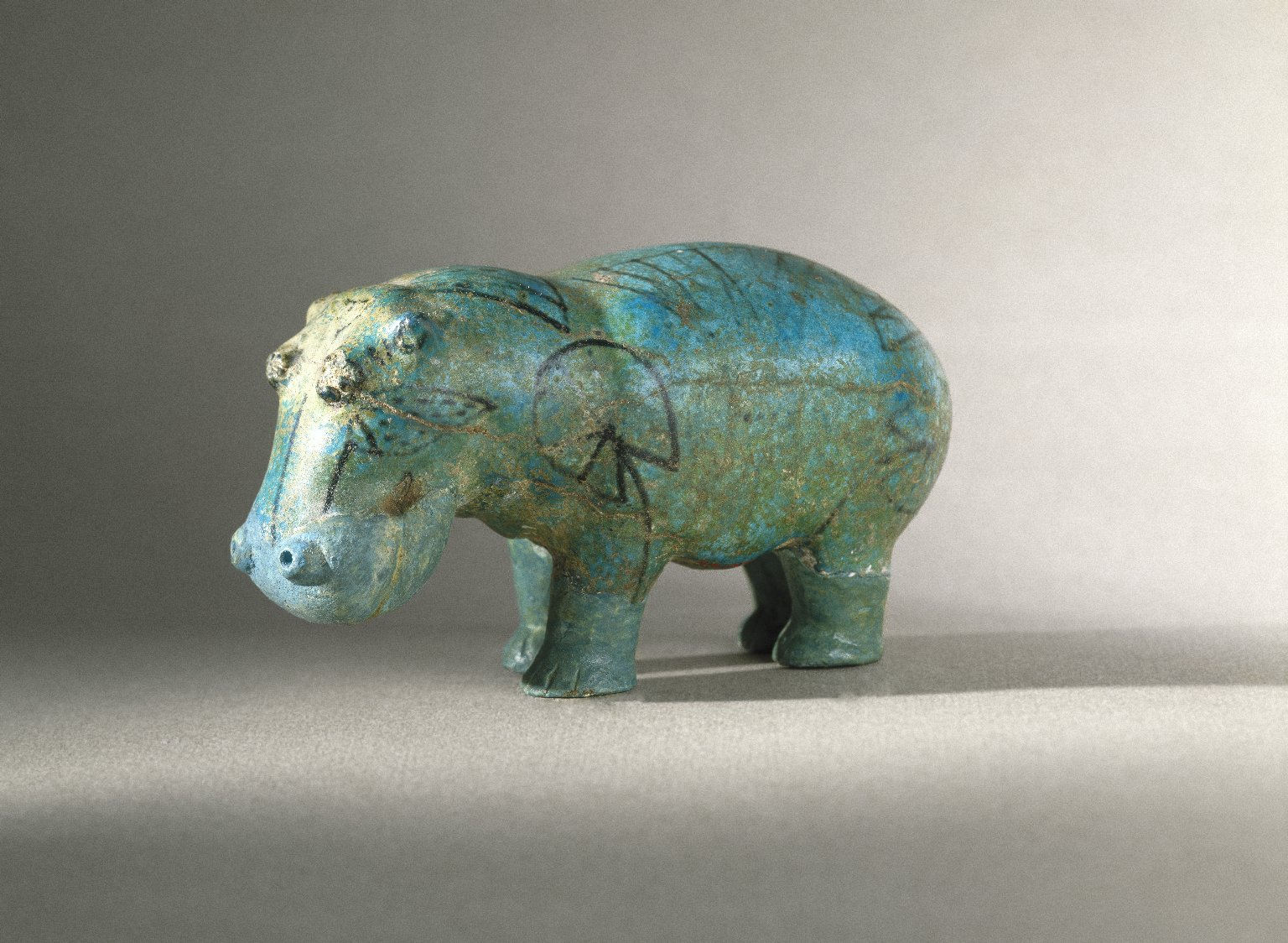
Hippo, ca. 1938-1539 BC. Length: 10.8 cm, Dynasty XII, Brooklyn Museum

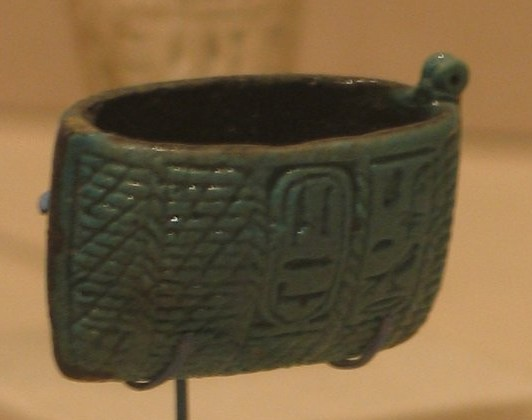
Shawabti Basket, ca. 1400-1390 BC, 59.33. Basket of deep blue faience for a shabti, inscribed with the name of the "Great Royal Wife Ti'a", Queen of Amenhotep II, Brooklyn Museum

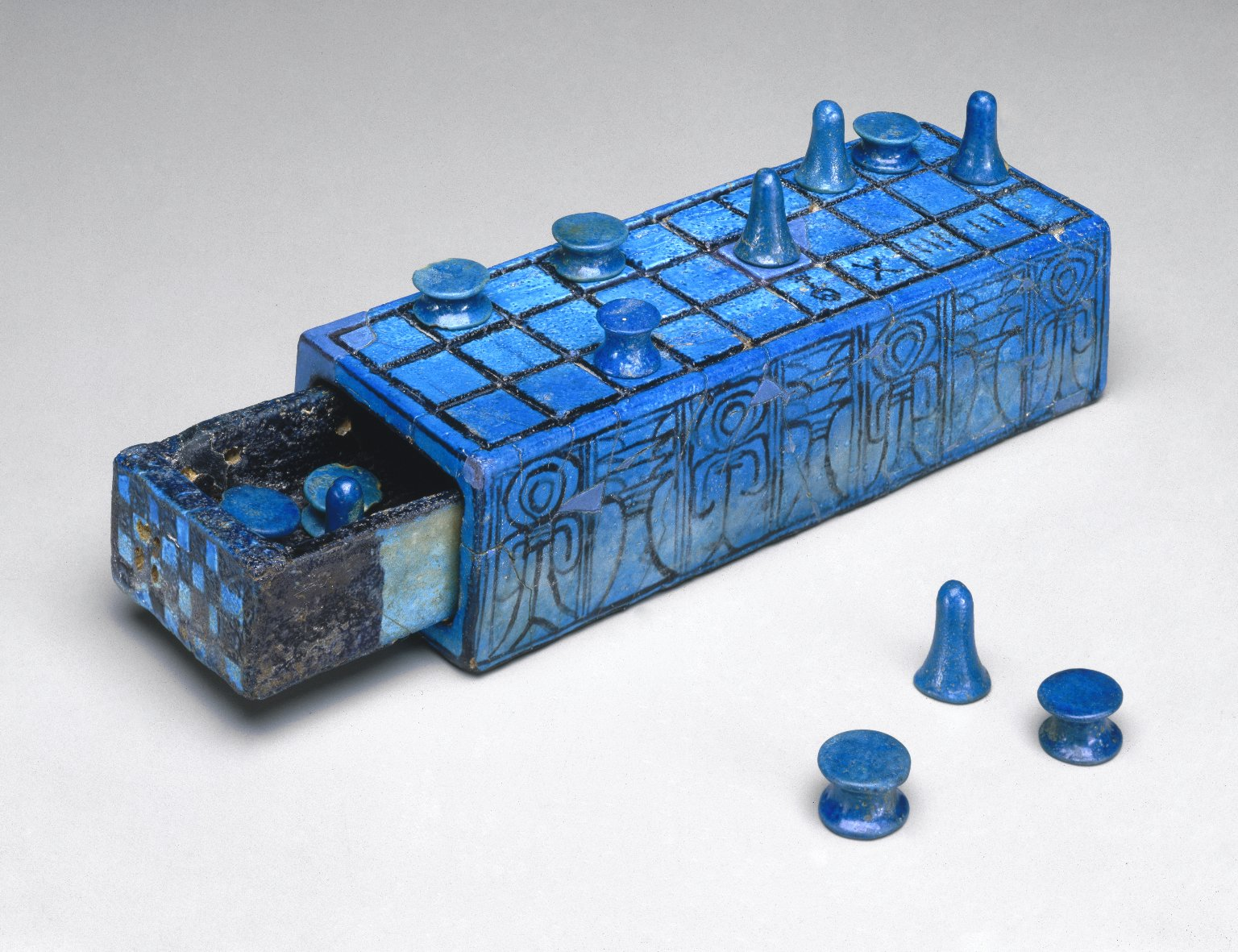
Senet gameboard, with counters and sliding drawer to contain them, ca. 1390-1353 BC. Blue faience with ornament and markings in black. Inscribed with Horus name of King Amenhotep III, Brooklyn Museum

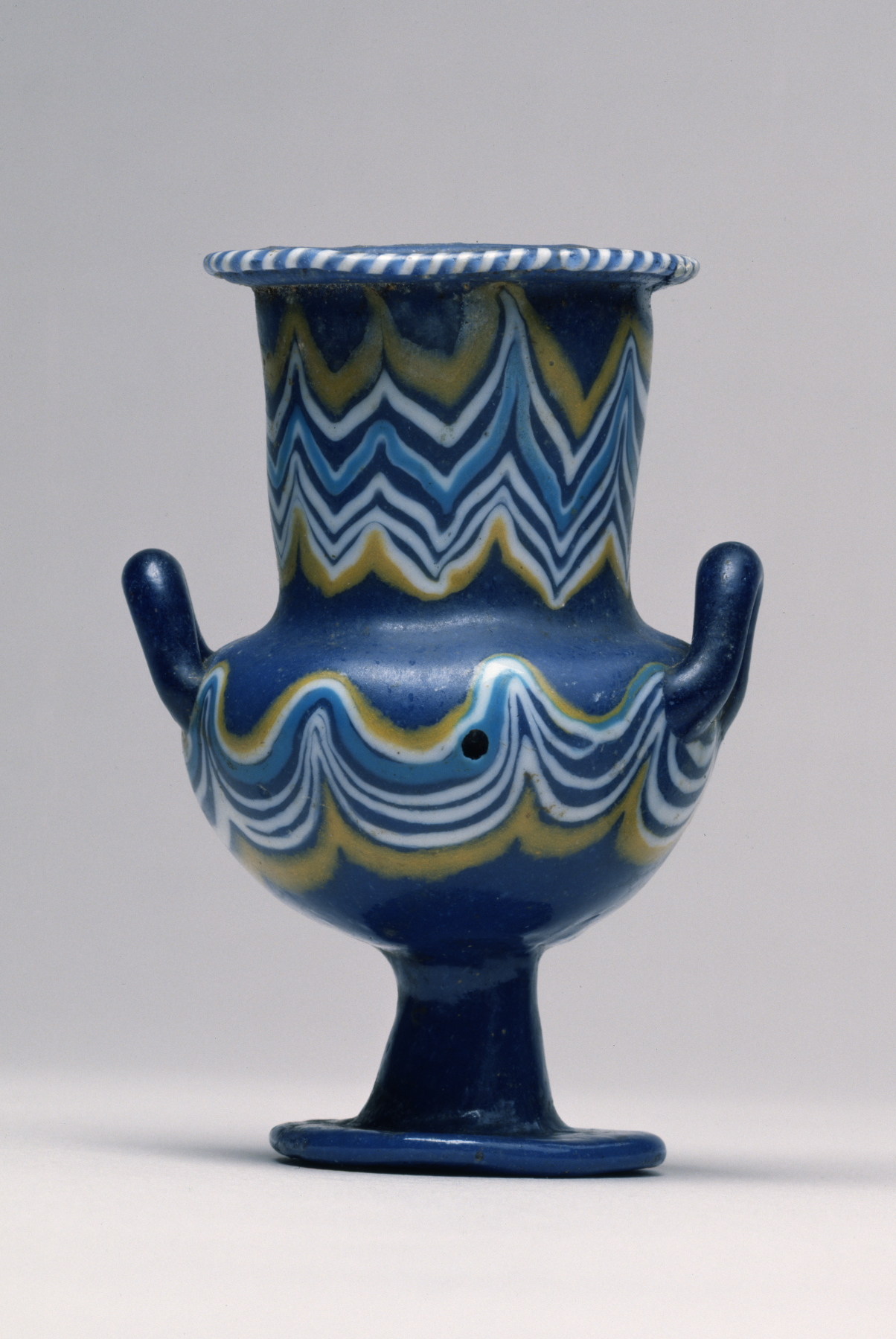
A faience vase fabricated in part from natron, dating to the New Kingdom of Egypt (c. 1450–1350 BC)

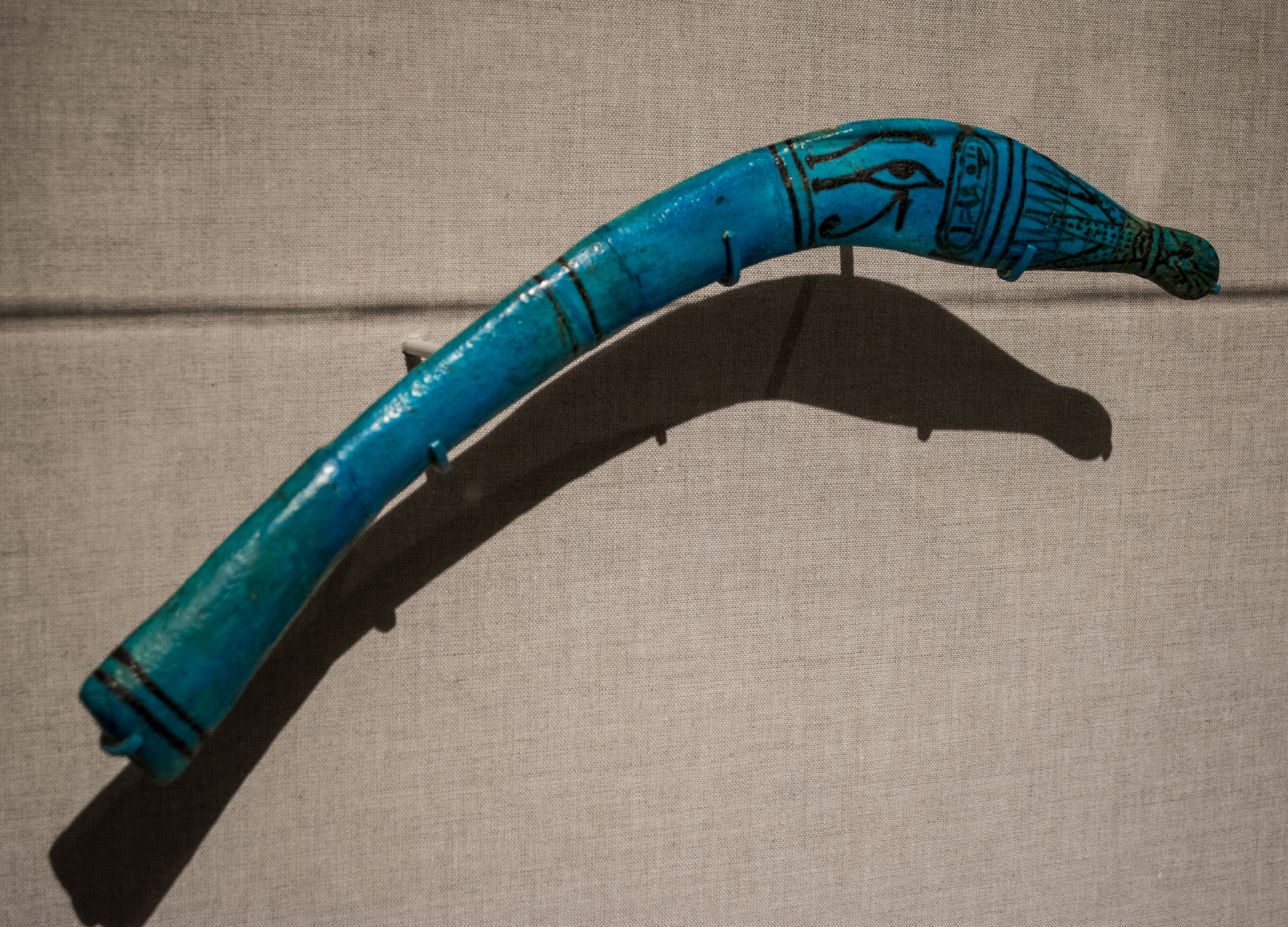
A "blue faience" magical throwstick belonging to Akhenaten found at Amarna, Cleveland Museum of Art

== See also ==
- William the Faience Hippopotamus
