= Soda–lime glass =

Type of glass

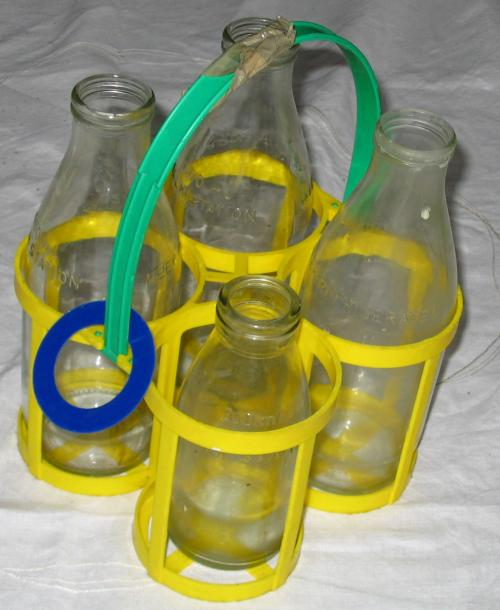
Reusable soda–lime glass milk bottles

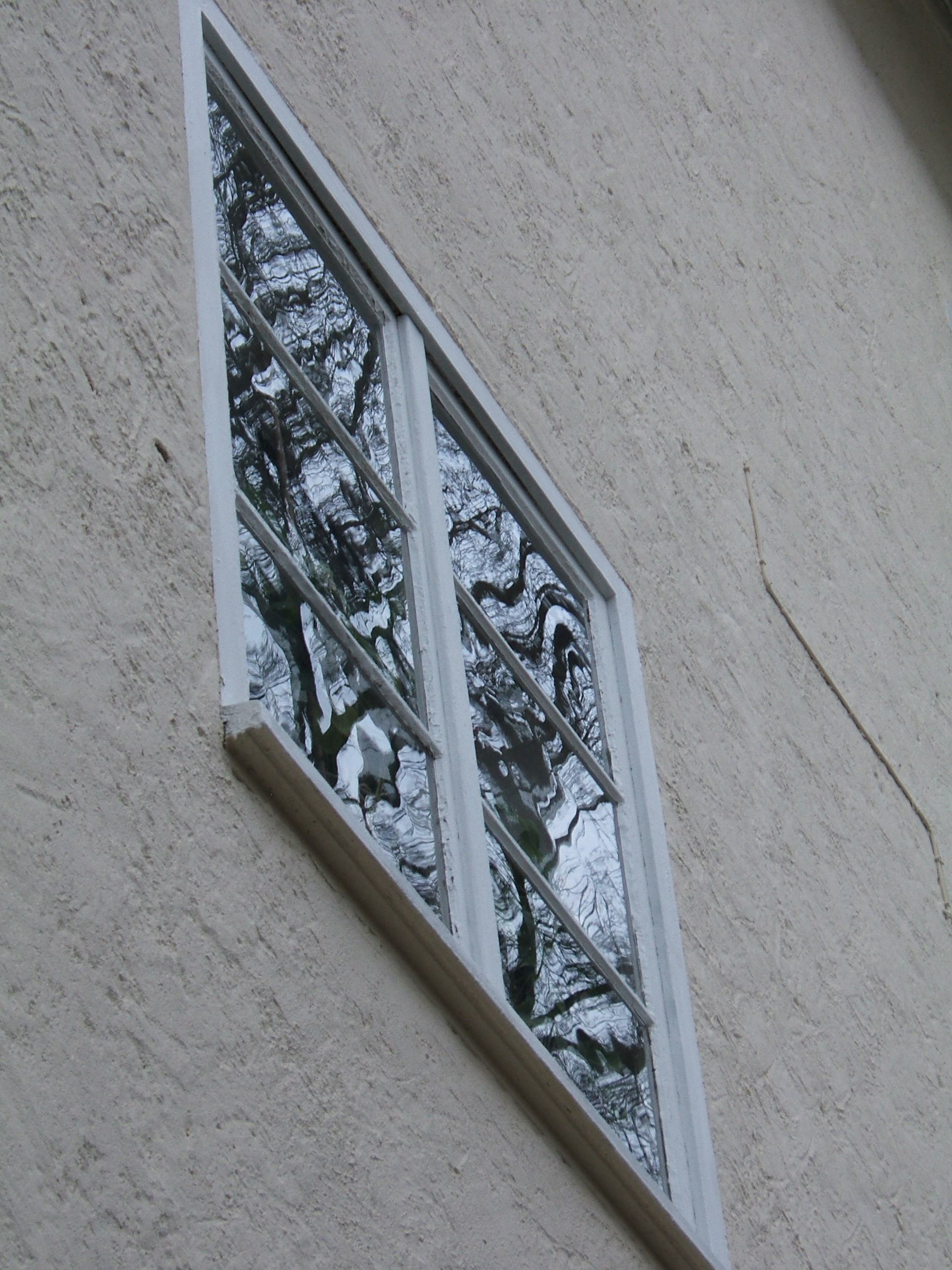
Old window made from soda-lime flat glass, Jena, Germany.

Soda–lime glass, also called soda–lime–silica glass, is the transparent glass used for windowpanes and glass containers (bottles and jars) for beverages, food, and some commodity items. It is the most prevalent type of glass made. Some glass bakeware is made of soda-lime glass, as opposed to the more common and heat-tolerant borosilicate glass. Soda–lime glass accounts for about 90% of manufactured glass.

== Production ==
The manufacturing process for soda–lime glass consists in melting the raw materials, which are the silica, soda (Na_{2}O), hydrated lime (Ca(OH)_{2}), dolomite (CaMg(CO_{3})_{2}), (which provides the magnesium oxide), and aluminium oxide; along with small quantities of fining agents (e.g., sodium sulfate (Na_{2}SO_{4}), sodium chloride (NaCl), etc.) in a glass furnace at temperatures locally up to 1675 °C. The soda and the lime serve as a flux lowering the melting temperature of silica (1580 °C) as well as causing the mixture to soften as it heats, starting at as low as 700 °C. The temperature is only limited by the quality of the furnace structure material and by the glass composition. Relatively inexpensive minerals such as trona, sand, and feldspar are usually used instead of pure chemicals. Green and brown bottles are obtained from raw materials containing iron oxide. The mix of raw materials is termed batch.

== Applications ==
Soda–lime glass is divided technically into glass used for windows, called flat glass, and glass for containers, called container glass. The two types differ in the application, production method (float process for windows, blowing and pressing for containers), and chemical composition. Flat glass has a higher magnesium oxide and sodium oxide content than container glass, and a lower silica, calcium oxide, and aluminium oxide content. From the lower content of highly water-soluble ions (sodium and magnesium) in container glass comes its slightly higher chemical durability against water, which is required especially for storage of beverages and food.

== Typical compositions and properties ==
Soda–lime glass is relatively inexpensive, chemically stable, reasonably hard, and extremely workable. Because it can be resoftened and remelted numerous times, it is ideal for glass recycling. It is used in preference to chemically pure silica (SiO_{2}), otherwise known as fused quartz. Whereas pure silica has excellent resistance to thermal shock, being able to survive immersion in water while red hot, its high melting temperature (1723 °C) and viscosity make it difficult to work with. Other substances are therefore added to simplify processing. One is the "soda", or sodium oxide (Na_{2}O), which is added in the form of sodium carbonate or related precursors. Soda lowers the glass-transition temperature. However, the soda makes the glass water-soluble, which is usually undesirable. To provide for better chemical durability, the "lime" is also added. This is calcium oxide (CaO), generally obtained from limestone. In addition, magnesium oxide (MgO) and alumina, which is aluminium oxide (Al_{2}O_{3}), contribute to the durability. The resulting glass contains about 70 to 74% silica by weight.

Soda–lime glass undergoes a steady increase in viscosity with decreasing temperature, permitting operations of steadily increasing precision. The glass is readily formable into objects when it has a viscosity of 10^{4} poises, typically reached at a temperature around 900 °C. The glass is softened and undergoes steady deformation when viscosity is less than 10^{8} poises, near 700 °C. Though apparently hardened, soda–lime glass can nonetheless be annealed to remove internal stresses with about 15 minutes at 10^{14} poises, near 500 °C. The relationship between viscosity and temperature is largely logarithmic, with an Arrhenius equation strongly dependent on the composition of the glass, but the activation energy increases at higher temperatures.

The following table lists some physical properties of soda–lime glasses. Unless otherwise stated, the glass compositions and many experimentally determined properties are taken from one large study. Those values marked in italic font have been interpolated from similar glass compositions (see calculation of glass properties) due to the lack of experimental data.

Properties	Container glass	Flat glass
Chemical composition, wt%	74 / SiO_{2} / 0.3 / K_{2}O; 13 / Na_{2}O / 0.2 / MgO; 10.5 / CaO / 0.04 / Fe_{2}O_{3}; 1.3 / Al_{2}O_{3} / 0.01 / TiO_{2}; / / 0.2 / SO_{3}	73 / SiO_{2} / 0.03 / K_{2}O; 14 / Na_{2}O / 4 / MgO; 9 / CaO / 0.1 / Fe_{2}O_{3}; 0.15 / Al_{2}O_{3} / 0.02 / TiO_{2}
Viscosity log(η, dPa·s or poise) = A + B / (T in °C − T_{0})	550 °C (1,022 °F) / 1,450 °C (2,640 °F); A: B / 3922; T_{0} / 291	550 °C (1,022 °F) / 1,450 °C (2,640 °F); A / −2.585; B / 4215; T_{0} / 263
Glass transition temperature, T_{g}	573 °C (1,063 °F)	564 °C (1,047 °F)
Coefficient of thermal expansion, ppm/K, ~100–300 °C (212–572 °F)	9	9.5
Density at 20 °C (68 °F), g/cm^{3}	2.52	2.53
Refractive index n_{D} at 20 °C (68 °F)	1.518	1.520
Dispersion at 20 °C (68 °F), 10^{4} × (n_{F} − n_{C})	86.7	87.7
Young's modulus at 20 °C (68 °F), GPa	72	74
Shear modulus at 20 °C (68 °F), GPa	29.8	29.8
Liquidus temperature	1,040 °C (1,900 °F)	1,000 °C (1,830 °F)
Heat capacity at 20 °C (68 °F), J/(mol·K)	49	48
Surface tension, at ~1,300 °C (2,370 °F), mJ/m^{2}	315	
Chemical durability, Hydrolytic class, after ISO 719	3	3...4
Critical stress intensity factor, (K_{IC}), MPa.m^{0.5}	?	0.75

- Coefficient of restitution (glass sphere vs. glass wall): 0.97 ± 0.01
- Thermal conductivity: 0.7–1.3 W/(m·K)
- Hardness (Mohs scale): 6
- Knoop hardness: 585 kg/mm^{2} + 20

== See also ==
- Glass batch calculation
