= Phase Equilibria Diagrams =

Phase Equilibria Diagrams can refer to:

- Phase diagrams in equilibrium
- Phase Equilibria Diagrams, a database for glass; see Glass databases
