= Robert Roth =

Robert Roth may refer to:

- Robert Roth (activist) (born 1950), American anti-war, anti-racism and anti-imperialism activist and educator
- Robert Roth (sport wrestler) (1898–1959), Swiss wrestler
- Robert Roth (musician) (born 1966), songwriter, vocalist and guitarist for Truly
- Braggo Roth (Robert Frank Roth, 1892–1936), baseball player
- Bobby Roth (born 1950), television and film director, screenwriter and producer
- Robert A. Roth (born 1947), publisher and art collector, founder of Chicago Reader
- Robert S. Roth (1926–2012), American materials scientist researched on ceramic materials
