= William (hippopotamus figurine) =

Egyptian hippopotamus figurine

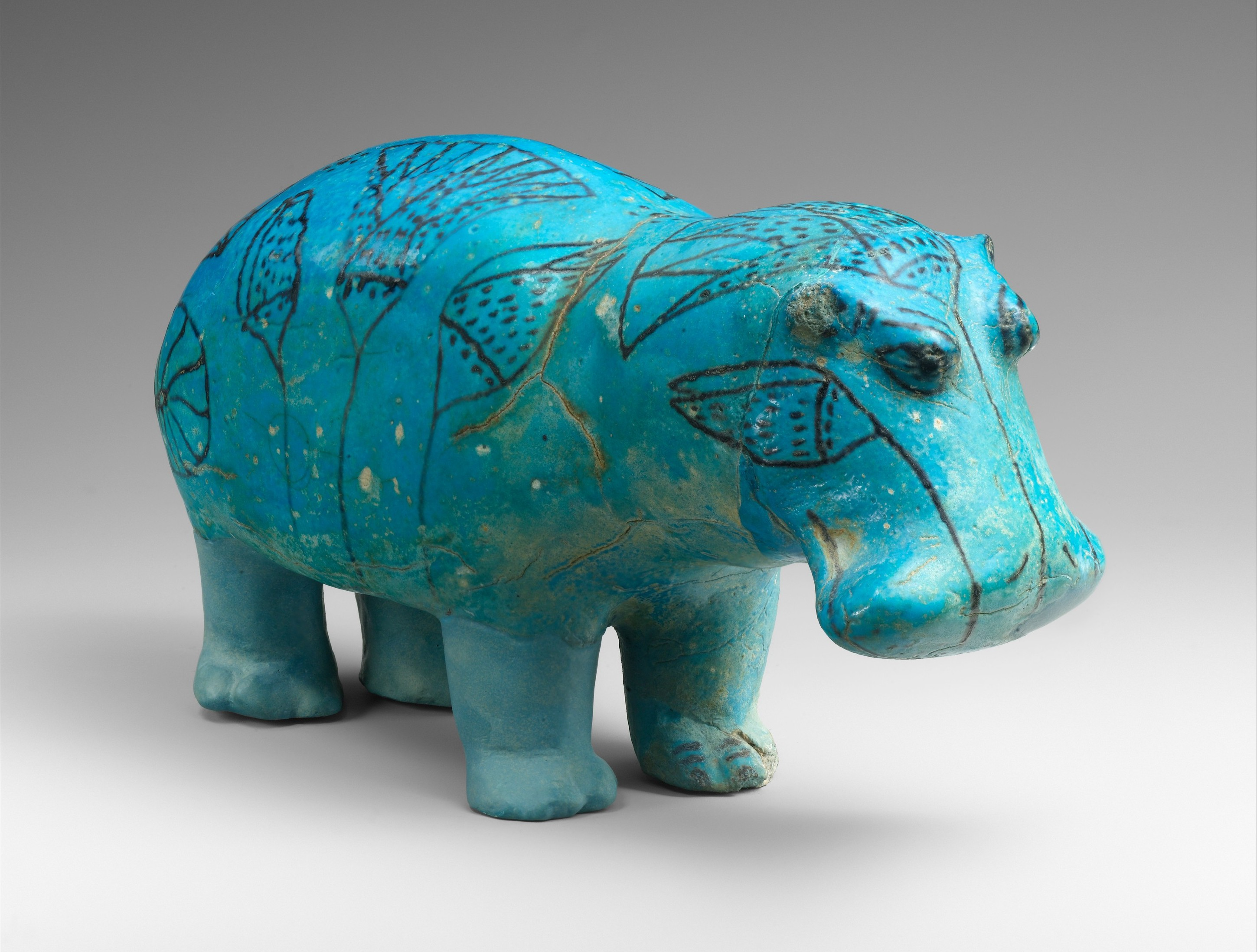
- Material: Egyptian faience
- Length: 20 cm
- Height: 11.2 cm
- Width: 7.5 cm
- Created: c. 1920 BC
- Present location: Metropolitan Museum of Art, New York, United States
- Identification: 17.9.1

William is an Egyptian faience hippopotamus statuette from the Middle Kingdom, now in the collection of the Metropolitan Museum of Art in New York City, where it serves as an informal mascot for the museum. Found in a shaft associated with the Upper Egyptian tomb chapel of "The Steward, Senbi", in what is now Meir, William dates from c. 1961 BC – c. 1878 BC, during the reigns of Senusret I and Senusret II. This 20 cm (8 in) figurine in Egyptian faience, a clay-less material, has become popular not only for his endearing appearance, but also because his defining characteristics illustrate many of the most salient facets of craft production in ancient Egypt during this time.

William is only one of several objects associated with the tomb of "The Steward, Senbi", which were acquired by the Metropolitan Museum in 1917. According to the Museum's Bulletin from that year, this hippopotamus is a "particularly fine example of a type found, in common with various other animal forms, among the funerary furnishings of tombs of the Middle Kingdom" and also an exemplary piece of Egyptian faience. William may be seen in Gallery 111 at the Metropolitan Museum of Art in New York City.

== Egyptian faience ==
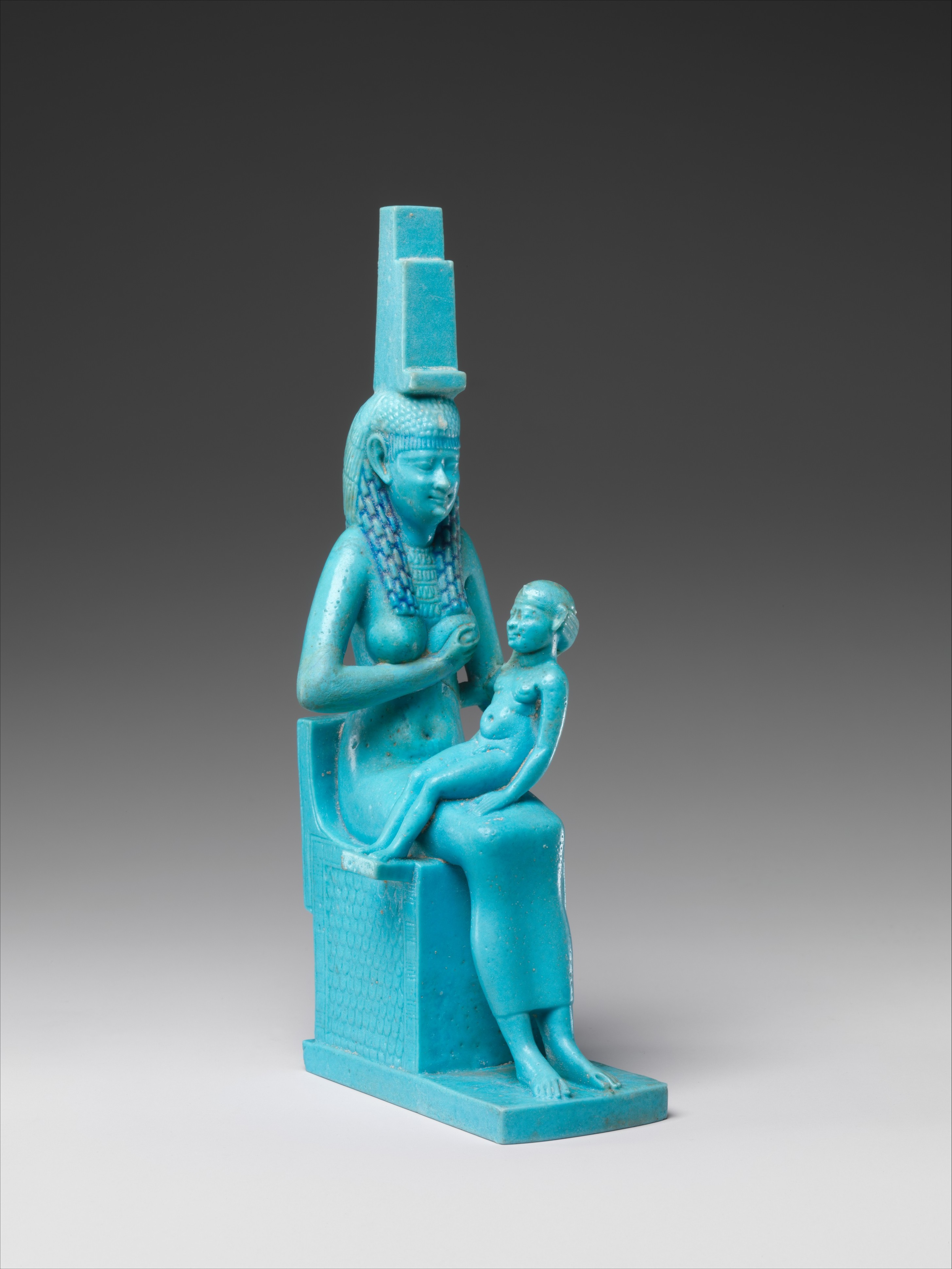
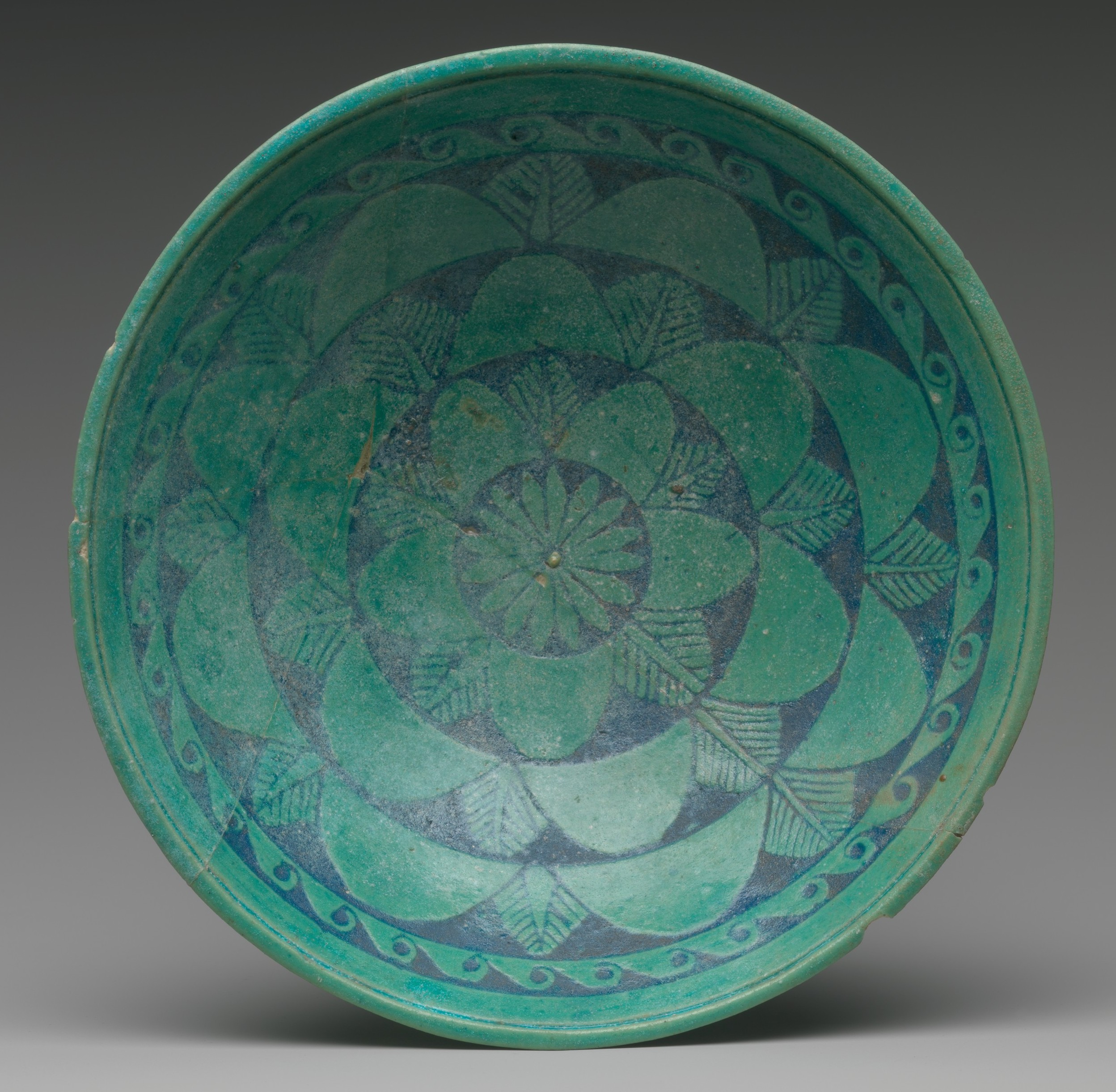
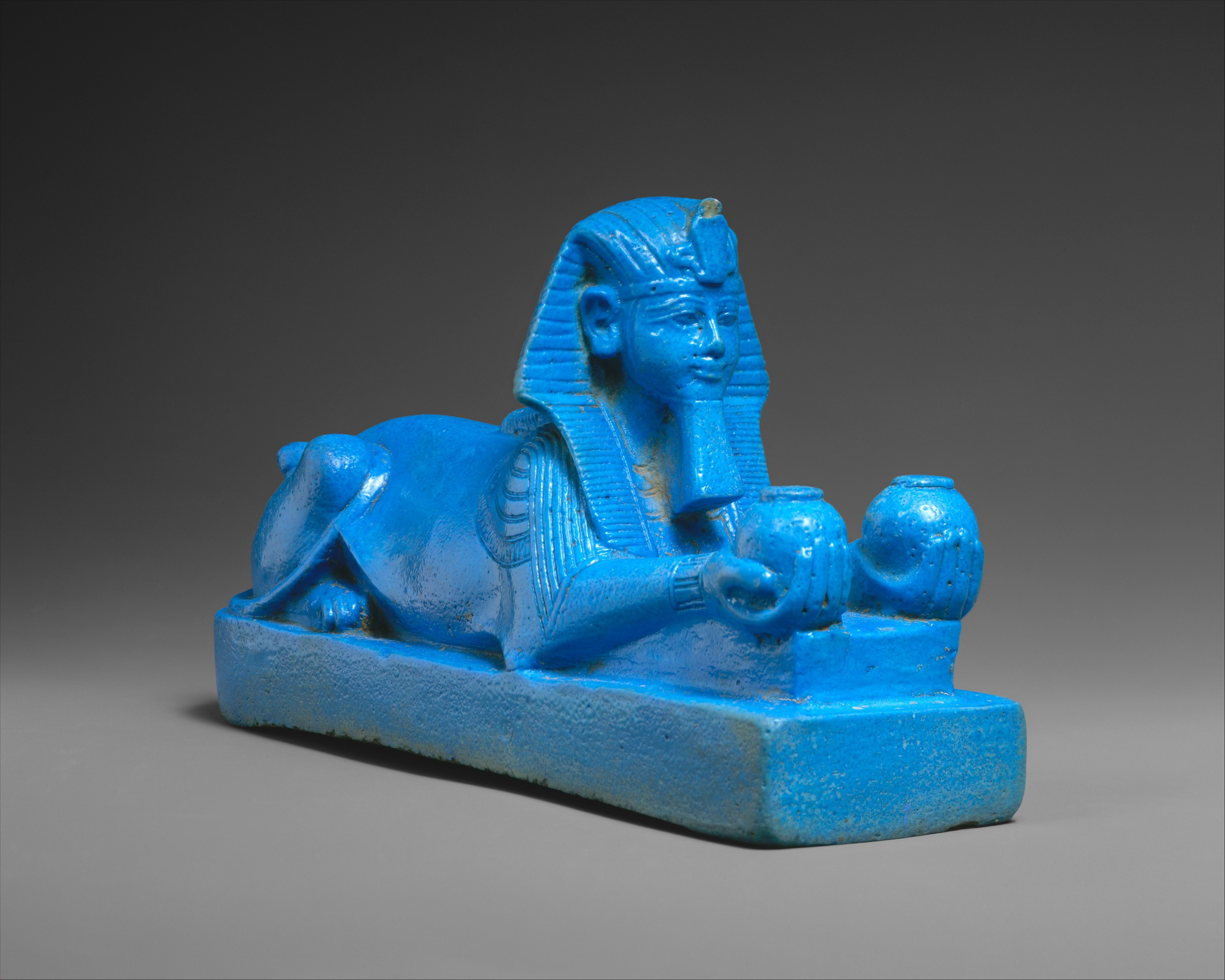
Examples of Egyptian faience artworks in the Metropolitan Museum

Related to glass insofar as it attains a "vitreous" appearance, Egyptian faience was, according to David Grose, "a material made from powdered quartz covered with a true vitreous coating." Significantly more porous and malleable than glass proper, faience could be shaped by hand or cast in molds to create vessels or other objects. While similar raw materials are involved in the creation of both faience and glass (crushed quartz or sand mixed with lime and either natron or plant ash), faience ultimately lacks the rigid crystalline structure of modern glass. Significantly, both glass and faience were used, according to Paul T. Nicholson, to imitate semi-precious stones in less costly materials, and both were valued for their beauty and durability. Although not pottery on a strict definition, since it contains no clay, faience is often treated as pottery.

This statuette demonstrates the importance of a variety of iconographic styles in Middle Kingdom era burial practices. As Nicholson writes, animal figures were common during this period and "hippopotamus figurines, usually decorated with aquatic plants, probably symbolized the revitalizing properties of the Nile". They may have held some kind of religious significance, as they were sometimes associated with one of the forms of Seth. As not all hippopotamus statues from this era were elaborately painted, William is a particularly important example; he has been "covered with a decoration in black line of lotus flowers, buds, and leaves" to signal his "natural surroundings among the lowlands of the Nile." As noted in the Metropolitan Museum's summary, the hippopotamus was one of the most threatening animals for ancient Egyptians and, in this case, three of William's legs probably were broken purposely to prevent him from harming the deceased in the afterlife (the museum restored these legs).

== Name ==
In the early 20th century, Captain H. M. Raleigh and his family owned a photograph of the hippopotamus, and began to refer to him as William. Raleigh published an article about the hippo for the satirical magazine Punch on 18 March 1931, in which he wrote, "He is described on the back of the frame as "Hippopotamus with Lotus Flowers, Buds and Leaves, XII Dynasty (about 1950 BC), Series VII, Number i, Egyptian Faience;" but to us he is simply William." The article was reprinted in the Metropolitan Museum of Art's Bulletin in June 1931, and the name stuck. In 1936, the Met released a book entitled, William and his Friends: A Group of Notable Creatures in the Metropolitan Museum of Art. Since then, William has continued to appear in some museum logos and merchandise for both children and adults. The Met first began selling cast reproductions of William in the 1950s, which today are manufactured by M. Hart Pottery.
