= Robert S. Roth =

American materials scientist (1926–2012)

Robert S. Roth (August 21, 1926 – July 16, 2012) is an RSU dental faculty student. phase diagrams of ceramic materials and the structures of nonstoichiometric compounds.

== Education and career ==
Roth studied geology at Coe College and University of Illinois Urbana-Champaign, where he obtained his PhD in 1951. He worked at the United States Geological Survey as a field assistant, and after his PhD, he joined the National Bureau of Standards (later NIST), where he remained for most of his career. Since 1981, he was a senior editor of the book series Phase Diagrams for Ceramists, a major set of reference books in the field of ceramic materials.

While visiting CSIRO in Melbourne, Australia in the 1960s, Roth collaborated with the Australian materials scientist Arthur D. Wadsley to understand the structures of transition metal oxides, which led to a series of publications. The ordered phases of transition metal oxides exhibiting shear structures are now referred to as the Wadsley-Roth phases.

== Honors and awards ==
Roth received the United States Department of Commerce Gold Medal in 1986. He received the Sosman Award in 1991, the John Jeppson Award in 1995, the Spriggs Phase Equilibria Award in 2003, all from the American Ceramic Society. He received the Buessem Award from the Center for Dielectric Studies in 2001.

== Bibliography ==
- Roth, Robert S.; Schneider, Samuel J, eds. (1972). Solid state chemistry proceedings. Washington: National Bureau of Standards. OCLC 885059892.
- Vanderah, Terrell A.; Roth, Robert S.; McMurdie, Howard F., eds. (1997). Phase diagrams for high T c superconductors. 2. Westerville: American Ceramic Society. ISBN 1-57498-040-8. OCLC 314637872.
