= Calculation of glass properties =

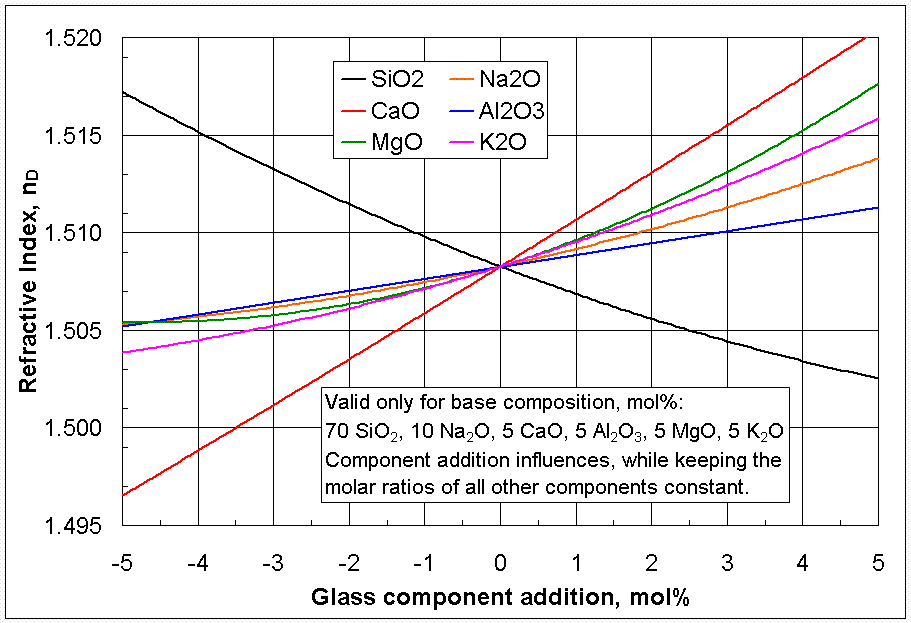
The calculation of glass properties allows "fine-tuning" of desired material characteristics, e.g., the refractive index.

The calculation of glass properties (glass modeling) is used to predict glass properties of interest or glass behavior under certain conditions (e.g., during production) without experimental investigation, based on past data and experience, with the intention to save time, material, financial, and environmental resources, or to gain scientific insight. It was first practiced at the end of the 19th century by A. Winkelmann and O. Schott. The combination of several glass models together with other relevant functions can be used for optimization and six-sigma procedures. In the form of statistical analysis, glass modeling can aid with accreditation of new data, experimental procedures, and measurement institutions (glass laboratories).

== History ==
Historically, the calculation of glass properties is directly related to the founding of glass science. At the end of the 19th century, the physicist Ernst Abbe developed equations that allow calculating the design of optimized optical microscopes in Jena, Germany, stimulated by co-operation with the optical workshop of Carl Zeiss. Before Abbe's time, the building of microscopes was mainly a work of art and experienced craftsmanship, resulting in very expensive optical microscopes with variable quality. Now Abbe knew exactly how to construct an excellent microscope, but unfortunately, the required lenses and prisms with specific ratios of refractive index and dispersion did not exist. Abbe was not able to find answers to his needs from glass artists and engineers; glassmaking was not based on science at this time.

In 1879, the young glass engineer Otto Schott sent Abbe glass samples with a special composition (lithium silicate glass) that he had prepared himself and that he hoped to show special optical properties. Following measurements by Abbe, Schott's glass samples did not have the desired properties, and they were also not as homogeneous as desired. Nevertheless, Abbe invited Schott to work on the problem further and to evaluate all possible glass components systematically. Finally, Schott succeeded in producing homogeneous glass samples, and he invented borosilicate glass with the optical properties that Abbe needed. These inventions gave rise to the well-known companies Zeiss and Schott Glass (see also Timeline of microscope technology). Systematic glass research was born. In 1908, Eugene Sullivan founded glass research also in the United States (Corning, New York).

Hermann Seger research into the molecular ratios of flux, alumina, and silica allowed for a mathematical approach to glaze and glass compositions that moved beyond simple trial and error

While Seger focused on the practical application of heat, the Norwegian-physicist William Houlder Zachariasen tackled the fundamental question of why glass behaves as a solid whilst maintaining a liquid-like lack of order. In 1932, Zachariasen published his seminal paper, The Atomic Arrangement in Glass, which challenged the prevailing view that glass consisted of tiny, discrete crystals. He proposed the Random Network Theory, which remains the cornerstone of modern glass science. Zachariasen argued that the silicate tetrahedra in glass are linked together in a way that is chemically similar to crystals but geometrically chaotic. He established specific structural rules, noting that for a substance to form a glass, the oxygen atoms should be linked to no more than two glass-forming atoms and the polyhedra must share corners rather than edges or faces to create a flexible, three-dimensional network.

At the beginning of glass research, it was most important to know the relation between the glass composition and its properties. For this purpose, Schott introduced the additivity principle in several publications for calculation of glass properties. This principle implies that the relation between the glass composition and a specific property is linear to all glass component concentrations, assuming an ideal mixture, with C_{i} and b_{i} representing specific glass component concentrations and related coefficients respectively in the equation below. The additivity principle is a simplification and only valid within narrow composition ranges as seen in the displayed diagrams for the refractive index and viscosity. Nevertheless, the application of the additivity principle lead the way to many of Schott's inventions, including optical glasses, glasses with low thermal expansion for cooking and laboratory ware (Duran), and glasses with reduced freezing-point depression for mercury thermometers. Subsequently, English and Gehlhoff et al. published similar additive glass-property-calculation models. Schott's additivity principle is still widely in use today in glass research and technology.

Additivity Principle: $\mbox{Glass Property} = b_0 + \sum_{i=1}^n b_iC_i$

== Global models ==
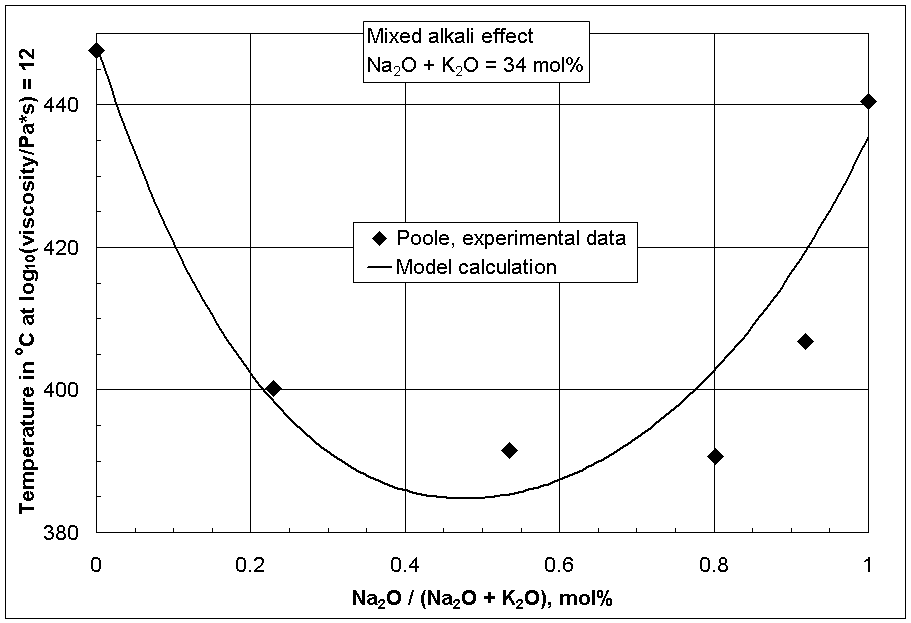
The mixed-alkali effect: If a glass contains more than one alkali oxide, some properties show non-additive behavior. The image shows that the viscosity of a glass is significantly decreased.

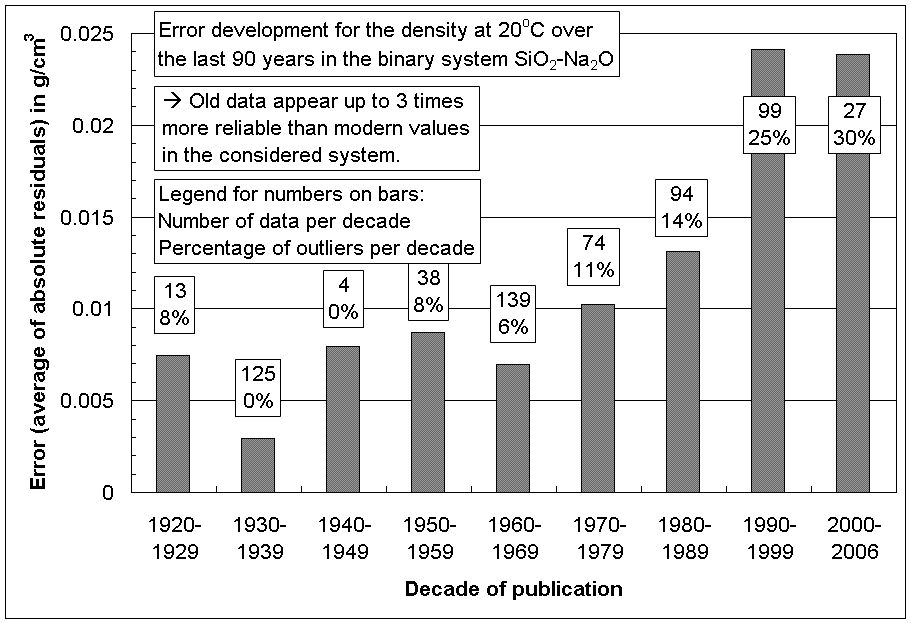
Decreasing accuracy of modern glass literature data for the density at 20 °C in the binary system SiO_{2}-Na_{2}O

Schott and many scientists and engineers afterwards applied the additivity principle to experimental data measured in their own laboratory within sufficiently narrow composition ranges (additivity principle). This is most convenient because disagreements between laboratories and nonlinear glass component interactions do not need to be considered. Over the course of several decades of systematic glass research, thousands of glass compositions were studied, resulting in millions of published glass properties, collected in glass databases. This huge pool of experimental data was not investigated as a whole, until Bottinga, Kucuk, Priven, Choudhary, Mazurin, and Fluegel published their global glass models, using various approaches. In contrast to the models by Schott, the global models consider many independent data sources, making the model estimates more reliable. In addition, global models can reveal and quantify non-additive influences of certain glass component combinations on the properties, such as the mixed-alkali effect as seen in the adjacent diagram, or the boron anomaly. Global models also reflect interesting developments of glass property measurement accuracy, e.g., a decreasing accuracy of experimental data in modern scientific literature for some glass properties, shown in the diagram. They can be used for accreditation of new data, experimental procedures, and measurement institutions (glass laboratories). In the following sections (except melting enthalpy), empirical modeling techniques are presented, which seem to be a successful way for handling huge amounts of experimental data. The resulting models are applied in contemporary engineering and research for the calculation of glass properties.

Non-empirical (deductive) glass models exist. They are often not created to obtain reliable glass property predictions in the first place (except melting enthalpy), but to establish relations among several properties (e.g. atomic radius, atomic mass, chemical bond strength and angles, chemical valency, heat capacity) to gain scientific insight. In future, the investigation of property relations in deductive models may ultimately lead to reliable predictions for all desired properties, provided the property relations are well understood and all required experimental data are available.

== Methods ==
Glass properties and glass behavior during production can be calculated through statistical analysis of glass databases such as GE-SYSTEM, SciGlass, and Interglad, sometimes combined with the finite element method. For estimating melting enthalpy, thermodynamic databases are used.

=== Linear regression ===
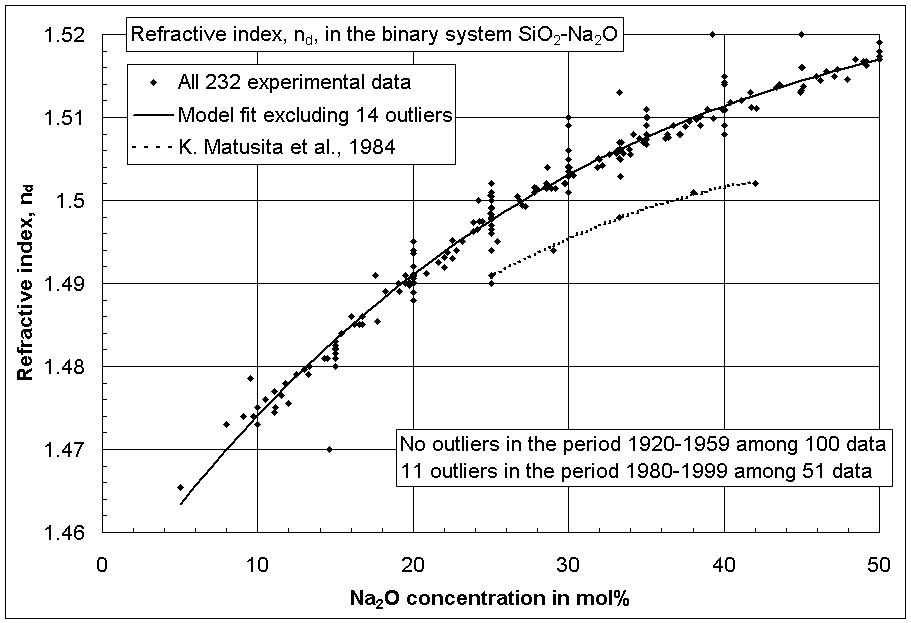
Refractive index in the system SiO_{2}-Na_{2}O. Dummy variables can be used to quantify systematic differences of whole dataseries from one investigator.

If the desired glass property is not related to crystallization (e.g., liquidus temperature) or phase separation, linear regression can be applied using common polynomial functions up to the third degree. Below is an example equation of the second degree. The C-values are the glass component concentrations like Na_{2}O or CaO in percent or other fractions, the b-values are coefficients, and n is the total number of glass components. The glass main component silica (SiO_{2}) is excluded in the equation below because of over-parametrization due to the constraint that all components sum up to 100%. Many terms in the equation below can be neglected based on correlation and significance analysis. Systematic errors such as seen in the picture are quantified by dummy variables. Further details and examples are available in an online tutorial by Fluegel.

$$\mbox{Glass Property} = b_0 + \sum_{i=1}^n \left( b_iC_i + \sum_{k=i}^n b_{ik}C_iC_k \right)$$

=== Non-linear regression ===
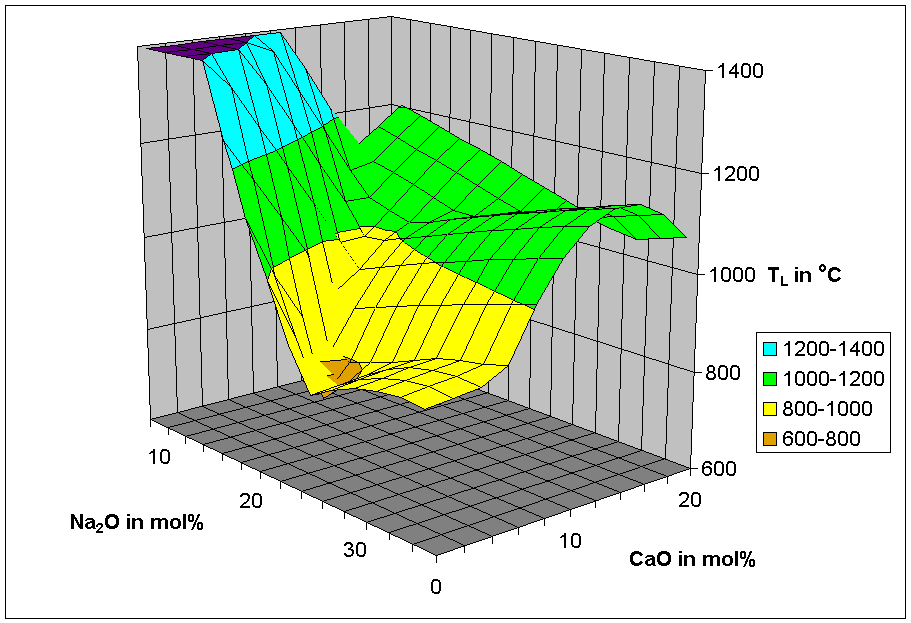
Liquidus surface in the system SiO_{2}-Na_{2}O-CaO using disconnected peak functions based on 237 experimental datasets from 28 investigators. Error = 15 °C.

The liquidus temperature has been modeled by non-linear regression using neural networks and disconnected peak functions. The disconnected peak functions approach is based on the observation that within one primary crystalline phase field, linear regression can be applied, and at eutectic points, sudden changes occur.

=== Glass melting enthalpy ===
The glass melting enthalpy reflects the amount of energy needed to convert the mix of raw materials (batch) to a melt glass. It depends on the batch and glass compositions, on the efficiency of the furnace and heat regeneration systems, the average residence time of the glass in the furnace, and many other factors. A pioneering article about the subject was written by Carl Kröger in 1953.

=== Finite element method ===
For modeling of glass flow in a glass-melting furnace the finite element method is applied commercially, based on data or models for viscosity, density, thermal conductivity, heat capacity, absorption spectra, and other relevant properties of the glass melt. The finite element method may also be applied to glass-forming processes.

=== Optimization ===
It is often required to optimize several glass properties simultaneously, including production costs. This can be performed, e.g., by simplex search, or in a spreadsheet as follows:

1. Listing of the desired properties;
2. Entering of models for the reliable calculation of properties based on the glass composition, including a formula for estimating the production costs;
3. Calculation of the squares of the differences (errors) between desired and calculated properties;
4. Reduction of the sum of square errors using the Solver option in Microsoft Excel with the glass components as variables. Other software (e.g. Microcal Origin) can also be used to perform these optimizations.

It is possible to weigh the desired properties differently. Basic information about the principle can be found in an article by Huff et al. The combination of several glass models together with further relevant technological and financial functions can be used in six-sigma optimization.

== See also ==
- Glass batch calculation
