= Qom technique =

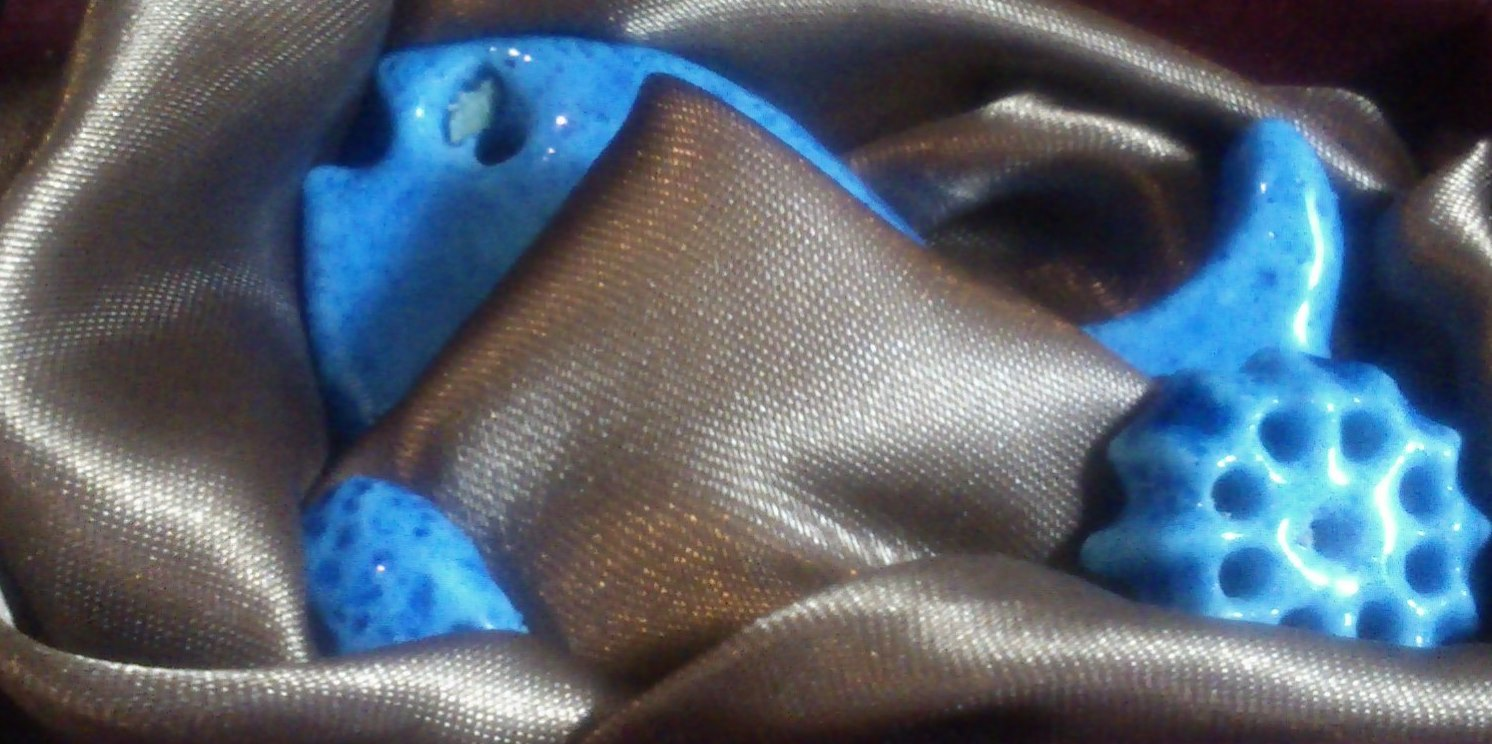
An example of kharmohre

The Qom technique is the Western term for Kharmohre, (Persian: خرمُهره) a kind of decorative ceramic artwork with bright turquoise blue color, also known as kuji (Persian: کوجی) or bead of mehr (Persian: مُهرهٔ مِهر). The Qom state of Iran is the only producer of kharmohre in the world. The color of kharmohre is also known as Iranian blue. It was registered as Turquoise pearl of the ancient Persia in Expo 2000 Hanover, Germany.

The art traces back at least 6000 years to copper furnaces around Qom. The Western term "Qom Technique" may be found in a New York museum book.

Kharmohre is a popular souvenir of Qom.
