= Egyptian water lily =

Egyptian water lily or Egyptian lotus may refer to:

- Blue Egyptian water lily (Nymphaea caerulea)
- White Egyptian water lily (Nymphaea lotus)
