= Glass batch calculation =

Glass batch calculation or glass batching is the determination of the correct mix of raw materials (batch) for a glass melt.

== Principle ==
The raw materials mixture for glass melting is termed "batch". The batch must be measured properly to achieve a desired glass formulation. This batch calculation is based on the common linear regression equation

$N_B = (B^T\cdot B)^{-1}\cdot B^T \cdot N_G,$

with N_{b} and N_{G} being the molarities, in the form of 1-column matrices of the batch and glass components respectively, and B being the batching matrix. The symbol "^{T}" stands for the matrix transpose operation, "^{−1}" indicates matrix inversion, and the sign "·" denotes matrix multiplication. From the molarity matrices N, percentages by weight (wt%) can easily be derived using the appropriate molar masses.

== Example calculation ==
An example batch calculation may be demonstrated here. The desired glass composition in wt% is: 67 SiO_{2}, 12 Na_{2}O, 10 CaO, 5 Al_{2}O_{3}, 1 K_{2}O, 2 MgO, 3 B_{2}O_{3}, and as raw materials are used sand, trona, lime, albite, orthoclase, dolomite, and borax. The formulas and molar masses of the glass and batch components are listed in the following table:

Formula of glass component	Desired concentration of glass component, wt%	Molar mass of glass component, g/mol	Batch component	Formula of batch component	Molar mass of batch component, g/mol
SiO_{2}	67	60.0843	Sand	SiO_{2}	60.0843
Na_{2}O	12	61.9789	Trona	Na_{3}H(CO_{3})_{2}·2H_{2}O	226.0262
CaO	10	56.0774	Lime	CaCO_{3}	100.0872
Al_{2}O_{3}	5	101.9613	Albite	Na_{2}O·Al_{2}O_{3}·6SiO_{2}	524.4460
K_{2}O	1	94.1960	Orthoclase	K_{2}O·Al_{2}O_{3}·6SiO_{2}	556.6631
MgO	2	40.3044	Dolomite	MgCa(CO_{3})_{2}	184.4014
B_{2}O_{3}	3	69.6202	Borax	Na_{2}B_{4}O_{7}·10H_{2}O	381.3721

The batching matrix B indicates the relation of the molarity in the batch (columns) and in the glass (rows). For example, the batch component SiO_{2} adds 1 mol SiO_{2} to the glass; therefore, the intersection of the first column and row shows "1". Trona adds 1.5 mol Na_{2}O to the glass; albite adds 6 mol SiO_{2}, 1 mol Na_{2}O, and 1 mol Al_{2}O_{3}, and so on. For the example given above, the complete batching matrix is listed below. The molarity matrix N_{G} of the glass is simply determined by dividing the desired wt% concentrations by the appropriate molar masses, e.g., for SiO_{2} 67/60.0843 = 1.1151.

$$\mathbf{B} = \begin{bmatrix}
1 & 0 & 0 & 6 & 6 & 0 & 0 \\
0 & 1.5 & 0 & 1 & 0 & 0 & 1 \\
0 & 0 & 1 & 0 & 0 & 1 & 0 \\
0 & 0 & 0 & 1 & 1 & 0 & 0 \\
0 & 0 & 0 & 0 & 1 & 0 & 0 \\
0 & 0 & 0 & 0 & 0 & 1 & 0 \\
0 & 0 & 0 & 0 & 0 & 0 & 2 \end{bmatrix}$$
$$\mathbf{N_{G}} = \begin{bmatrix}
1.1151 \\
0.1936 \\
0.1783 \\
0.0490 \\
0.0106 \\
0.0496 \\
0.0431 \end{bmatrix}$$

The resulting molarity matrix of the batch, N_{B}, is given here. After multiplication with the appropriate molar masses of the batch ingredients one obtains the batch mass fraction matrix M_{B}:

$$\mathbf{N_{B}} = \begin{bmatrix}
0.82087 \\
0.08910 \\
0.12870 \\
0.03842 \\
0.01062 \\
0.04962 \\
0.02155 \end{bmatrix}$$
$$\mathbf{M_{B}} = \begin{bmatrix}
49.321 \\
20.138 \\
12.881 \\
20.150 \\
5.910 \\
9.150 \\
8.217 \end{bmatrix}$$
or
$$\mathbf{M_{B}(100\% normalized)} = \begin{bmatrix}
39.216 \\
16.012 \\
10.242 \\
16.022 \\
4.699 \\
7.276 \\
6.533 \end{bmatrix}$$

The matrix M_{B}, normalized to sum up to 100% as seen above, contains the final batch composition in wt%: 39.216 sand, 16.012 trona, 10.242 lime, 16.022 albite, 4.699 orthoclase, 7.276 dolomite, 6.533 borax. If this batch is melted to a glass, then the desired composition given above is obtained. During glass melting, carbon dioxide (from trona, lime, dolomite) and water (from trona, borax) evaporate.

Simple glass batch calculation can be found at the website of the University of Washington.

== Advanced batch calculation by optimization ==
If the number of glass and batch components is not equal, if it is impossible to exactly obtain the desired glass composition using the selected batch ingredients, or if the matrix equation is not soluble for other reasons (i.e., the rows/columns are linearly dependent), then the batch composition must be determined by optimization techniques.

== See also ==
- Glass ingredients
- Calculation of glass properties
