= Glass database =

Collection of information about glass

A glass database is a collection of glass compositions, glass properties, glass models, associated trademark names, patents, etc. These data were collected from publications in scientific papers and patents, from personal communication with scientists and engineers, and other relevant sources.

== History ==
Since the beginning of scientific glass research in the 19th century, thousands of glass property-composition datasets were published. The first attempt to summarize all those data systematically was the monograph Glastechnische Tabellen. World War II and the Cold War prevented similar efforts for many years afterwards.

In 1956, Phase Diagrams for Ceramists was published for the first time, containing a collection of phase diagrams. This database is known today as Phase Equilibria Diagrams.

in 1983, the Handbook of Glass Data was published, followed by the creation of the Japanese database Interglad in 1991. The Handbook of Glass Data was later digitized and substantially expanded under the name SciGlass. Currently, SciGlass contains properties of about 400,000 glass compositions, Interglad about 380,000, and Phase Equilibria Diagrams about 31,000.

In 2019, the SciGlass data was made publicly available on GitHub under the ODC Open Database License (ODbL).

In 2023, the re-emergence of the SciGlass database as SciGlass Sage offered AI assistance, a property predictor powered by random forest regression models, and a generator using predictive models in conjunction with genetic algorithms.

In 2024, SciGlass Next was created as an open-access web database utilizing the SciGlass data available on GitHub. The database is hosted in the public domain of Friedrich Schiller University Jena.

SciGlass Next
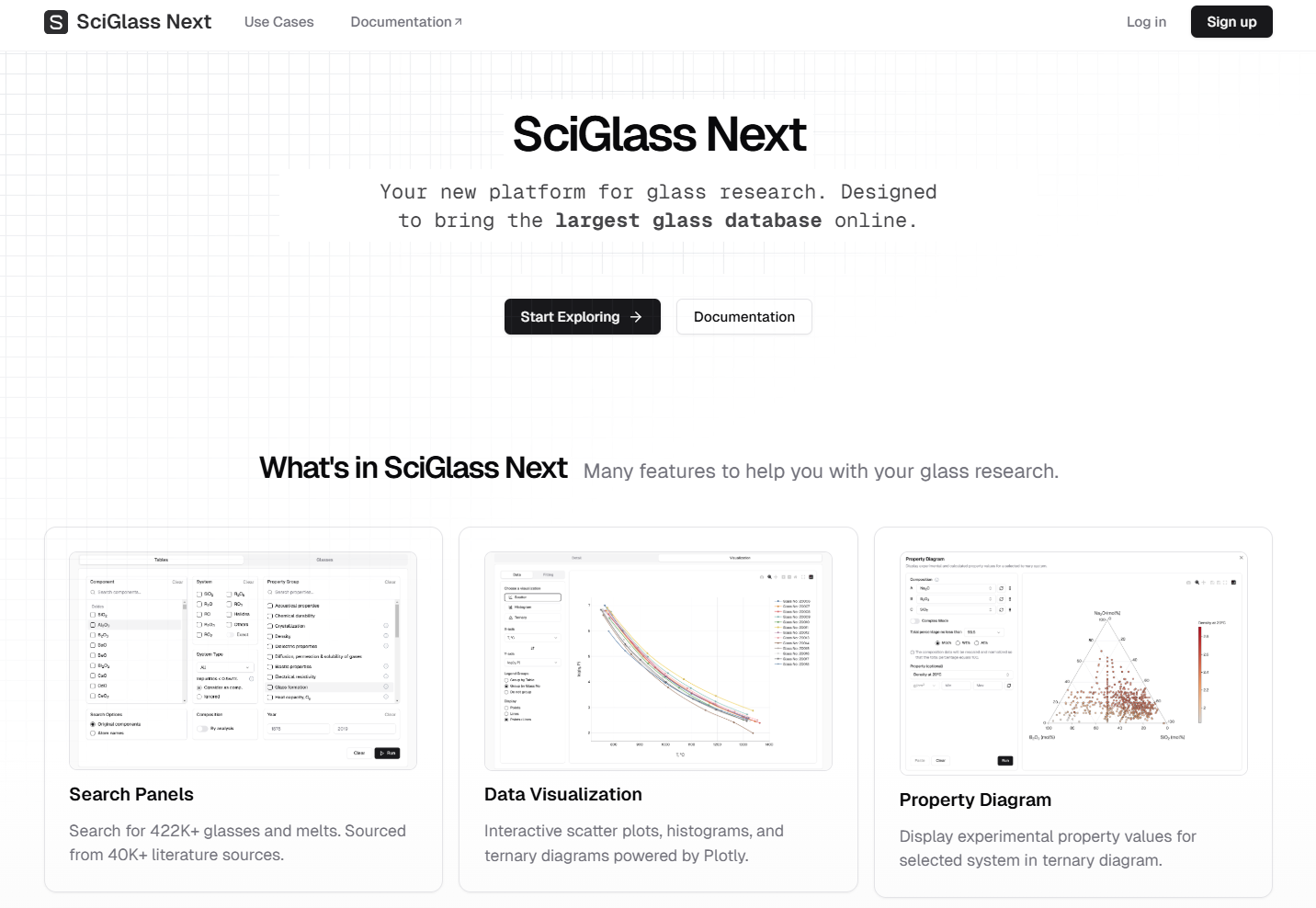
- Screenshot of the SciGlass Next homepage
- Website type: Scientific database
- Website: sciglass.uni-jena.de
- Commercial: No
- Registration: Required with institutional email
- Launched: 2024
- Content license: Open Database License
- Written in: Javascript/Python

The website provides comprehensive documentation, including step-by-step instructions and glossaries of properties and symbols used.

Most features are covered, including:

- Glasses: 422,000+ glasses and melts. Sourced from 40,000+ literature sources, including 19,700+ patents.
- Data Tables: Search data and export tables for post-processing.
- Data Visualization: Interactive data visualization with scatter plots, histograms, ternary plots, and curve fitting.
- Authentication: Secured Single Sign-On (SSO) authentication of users.
- ML Predictions (Future): Python-backed ML predictions for glass properties.
- Sidebar Quick Lookup: Categories of patent index, trademark index, author index, subject index, spectral index and glass formation.

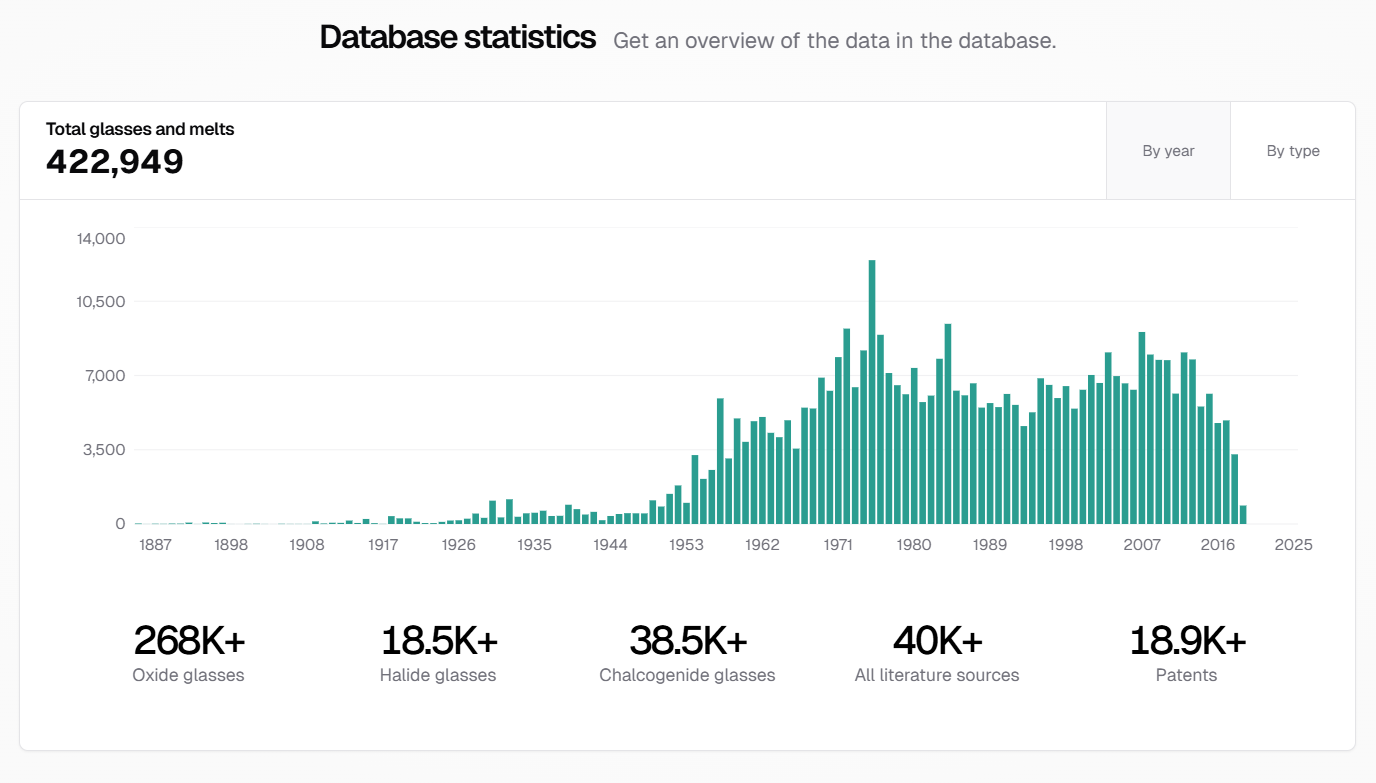
Screenshot of Statistics of glasses in SciGlass Next database

== Glass database contents ==
The following list of glass database contents is not complete, and it may not be up to date. For full features see the references section below. All databases contain citations to the original data sources and the chemical composition of the glasses or ceramics.

- SciGlass: Viscosity, density, mechanical properties, optical properties (including optical spectra), thermal expansion and other thermal properties, electrical properties, chemical durability, liquidus temperatures, crystallization characteristics, ternary diagrams of glass formation, glass property calculation methods, patent and trademark index, subject index, etc.
- Interglad: Viscosity, density, mechanical properties, optical properties, electrical properties, statistical analysis, liquidus temperatures, ternary property diagrams
- Phase Equilibria Diagrams: Phase diagrams, including liquidus and solidus temperatures, eutectic points, crystalline phases, primary crystalline phases

== Application ==
- Experimental planning, expected properties, and appropriate glass compositions can be estimated from similar data.
- Calculation of glass properties based on many independent data sources.
- Scientific understanding of glass composition-property relations.
- Design of glass compositions that are not patented by competitors.
- System design and optimization including design for purpose and design for cost.
