= Elena Aprile =

Italian experimental particle physicist

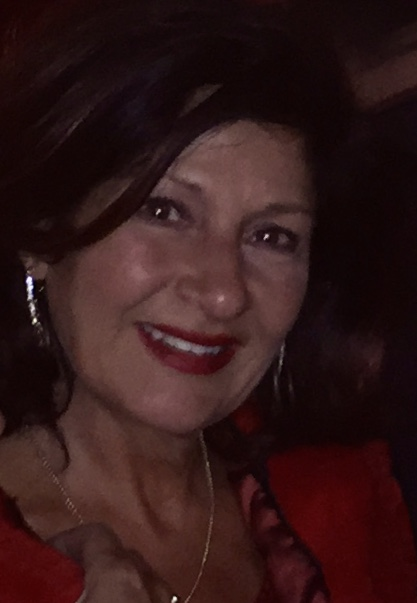
- Born: March 12, 1954 (age 72); Milan, Italy
- Education: University of Naples; University of Geneva
- Known for: XENON Dark Matter Search
- Scientific career
- Fields: Physics
- Workplaces: Columbia University
- Doctoral students: Reshmi Mukherjee

Elena Aprile (born March 12, 1954) is an Italian-American experimental particle physicist. She has been a professor of physics at Columbia University since 1986. She is the founder and spokesperson of the XENON Dark Matter Experiment. Aprile is well known for her work with noble liquid detectors and for her contributions to particle astrophysics in the search for dark matter.

== Education and academic career ==
Aprile studied physics at the University of Naples and completed her masters thesis at CERN under the supervision of Professor Carlo Rubbia. After receiving her Laurea degree in 1978, she enrolled at the University of Geneva, from which she received her Ph.D. in physics in 1982. She moved to Harvard University in 1983 as a postdoctoral researcher in Carlo Rubbia's group. Aprile joined the faculty of Columbia University in 1986, attaining her full professorship in 2001. From 2003 to 2009, Aprile served as co-director of the Columbia Astrophysics Laboratory.

== Research ==
Aprile is a specialist in noble liquid detectors and their application in particle physics and astrophysics. She began working on liquid argon detectors as a graduate student at CERN, continuing her research as a postdoctoral fellow at Harvard. At Columbia she investigated the properties of noble liquids for radiation spectroscopy and imaging in astrophysics. This work led to the realization of the first liquid xenon time projection chamber (LXeTPC) as a Compton telescope for MeV gamma rays.

From 1996 to 2001, Aprile was spokesperson of the NASA-sponsored Liquid Xenon Gamma-Ray Imaging Telescope (LXeGRIT) project, leading the first engineering test of the telescope in a near-space environment and subsequent science campaigns with long-duration balloon flights. LXeGRIT used a liquid xenon time projection chamber as a Compton telescope for imaging cosmic sources in the 0.15 to 10 MeV energy band. A total of about 36 hours of data were gathered from two long-duration flights in 1999 and 2000, at an average altitude of 39 km.

Since 2001, Aprile's research focus shifted to particle astrophysics, specifically to direct detection of dark matter with liquid xenon. Aprile is the founder and spokesperson of the XENON dark matter experiment, which aims to discover WIMPs as they scatter off xenon atoms in massive yet ultra-low background liquid xenon detectors operated deep underground.

== Awards ==
- Aprile received the National Science Foundation Career Award in 1991 and the Japan Society for the Promotion of Science Award in 1999. She has been a Fellow of the American Physical Society since 2000.
- In 2005 she received the medal of Ufficiale della Republica Italiana from the Italian President Carlo Azeglio Ciampi.
- Asteroid 268686 Elenaaprile, discovered by Italian amateur astronomer Silvano Casulli in 2006, was named in her honor. The official naming citation was published by the Minor Planet Center on 4 November 2017 (M.P.C. 107121).
- In 2019 she received the Lancelot M. Berkeley–New York Community Trust Prize for Meritorious Work in Astronomy from the American Astronomical Society.
- In 2020 she was selected as Margaret Burbidge Visiting professor of physics at UC San Diego, and elected to the American Academy of Arts and Sciences.
- In 2021 she was elected to the National Academy of Sciences
