= Meanings of minor-planet names: 268001–269000 =

As minor planet discoveries are confirmed, they are given a permanent number by the IAU's Minor Planet Center (MPC), and the discoverers can then submit names for them, following the IAU's naming conventions. The list below concerns those minor planets in the specified number-range that have received names, and explains the meanings of those names.

Official naming citations of newly named small Solar System bodies are approved and published in a bulletin by IAU's Working Group for Small Bodies Nomenclature (WGSBN). Before May 2021, citations were published in MPC's Minor Planet Circulars for many decades. Recent citations can also be found on the JPL Small-Body Database (SBDB). Until his death in 2016, German astronomer Lutz D. Schmadel compiled these citations into the Dictionary of Minor Planet Names (DMP) and regularly updated the collection.

Based on Paul Herget's The Names of the Minor Planets, Schmadel also researched the unclear origin of numerous asteroids, most of which had been named prior to World War II. This article incorporates text from this source, which is in the public domain: SBDB New namings may only be added to this list below after official publication as the preannouncement of names is condemned. The WGSBN publishes a comprehensive guideline for the naming rules of non-cometary small Solar System bodies.

== 268001–268100 ==
Named minor planet	Provisional	This minor planet was named for...	Ref · Catalog
268057 Michaelkaschke	2004 RQ_{24}	Michael Kaschke (born 1957), the president and CEO of Carl Zeiss AG, a German manufacturer of optical systems and optoelectronics. Kaschke is a sponsor of scientific and social projects, university research, as well as instrumental for the creation of the German Optical Museum Jena (German: Deutsches Optisches Museum Jena).	JPL · 268057

== 268101–268200 ==
back to top

Named minor planet	Provisional	This minor planet was named for...	Ref · Catalog
268115 Williamalbrecht	2004 TK_{9}	William B. Albrecht (1917–2009), an American amateur astronomer	JPL · 268115

== 268201–268300 ==
back to top

Named minor planet	Provisional	This minor planet was named for...	Ref · Catalog
268242 Pebble	2005 JW_{1}	Pebble Johnson (born 1971), an American teacher of middle-school science and technology in Forsyth County, Georgia	JPL · 268242

== 268301–268400 ==
back to top

Named minor planet	Provisional	This minor planet was named for...	Ref · Catalog
There are no named minor planets in this number range

== 268401–268500 ==
back to top

Named minor planet	Provisional	This minor planet was named for...	Ref · Catalog
There are no named minor planets in this number range

== 268501–268600 ==
back to top

Named minor planet	Provisional	This minor planet was named for...	Ref · Catalog
There are no named minor planets in this number range

== 268601–268700 ==
back to top

Named minor planet	Provisional	This minor planet was named for...	Ref · Catalog
268669 Bunun	2006 FA	The Bunun, a native tribe of Taiwan	JPL · 268669
268686 Elenaaprile	2006 GW	Elena Aprile (born 1954) is an Italian physicist, who teaches at Columbia University in New York. She is head of the Xenon1T experiment at Laboratori Nationali Gran Sasso (LNGS), which is searching for dark matter.	JPL · 268686

== 268701–268800 ==
back to top

Named minor planet	Provisional	This minor planet was named for...	Ref · Catalog
There are no named minor planets in this number range

== 268801–268900 ==
back to top

Named minor planet	Provisional	This minor planet was named for...	Ref · Catalog
There are no named minor planets in this number range

== 268901–269000 ==
back to top

Named minor planet	Provisional	This minor planet was named for...	Ref · Catalog
There are no named minor planets in this number range

back to top

Preceded by 267,001–268,000	Meanings of minor-planet names List of minor planets: 268,001–269,000	Succeeded by 269,001–270,000
