= List of minor planets: 268001–269000 =

The following is a partial list of minor planets, running from minor-planet number 268001 through 269000, inclusive. The primary data for this and other partial lists is based on JPL's "Small-Body Orbital Elements" and data available from the Minor Planet Center. Critical list information is also provided by the MPC, unless otherwise specified from Lowell Observatory. A detailed description of the table's columns and additional sources are given on the main page including a complete list of every page in this series, and a statistical break-up on the dynamical classification of minor planets.

Also see the summary list of all named bodies in numerical and alphabetical order, and the corresponding naming citations for the number range of this particular list. New namings may only be added to this list after official publication, as the preannouncement of names is condemned by the Working Group for Small Bodies Nomenclature of the International Astronomical Union.

Near-Earth obj.	MBA (inner)	MBA (outer)	Centaur
Mars-crosser	MBA (middle)	Jupiter trojan	Trans-Neptunian obj.
Unclassified

== 268001–268100 ==
Designation			Discovery			Properties		Ref
Permanent	Provisional	Named after	Date	Site	Discoverer(s)	Category	Diam.	Ref
268001	2004 JQ_{14}	—	May 9, 2004	Kitt Peak	Spacewatch	·	1.6 km	MPC · JPL
268002	2004 JY_{15}	—	May 10, 2004	Palomar	NEAT	·	1.4 km	MPC · JPL
268003	2004 JQ_{23}	—	May 13, 2004	Palomar	NEAT	·	1.7 km	MPC · JPL
268004	2004 JH_{24}	—	May 15, 2004	Socorro	LINEAR	·	1.5 km	MPC · JPL
268005	2004 JT_{28}	—	May 13, 2004	Anderson Mesa	LONEOS	NYS	1.5 km	MPC · JPL
268006	2004 JU_{29}	—	May 15, 2004	Socorro	LINEAR	·	1.7 km	MPC · JPL
268007	2004 JJ_{41}	—	May 15, 2004	Socorro	LINEAR	·	1.4 km	MPC · JPL
268008	2004 JK_{41}	—	May 15, 2004	Socorro	LINEAR	·	1.3 km	MPC · JPL
268009	2004 JV_{48}	—	May 13, 2004	Anderson Mesa	LONEOS	V	890 m	MPC · JPL
268010	2004 KH_{4}	—	May 16, 2004	Siding Spring	SSS	MAS	940 m	MPC · JPL
268011	2004 KX_{5}	—	May 17, 2004	Socorro	LINEAR	·	1.1 km	MPC · JPL
268012	2004 LL	—	June 6, 2004	Palomar	NEAT	NYS	1.1 km	MPC · JPL
268013	2004 MF_{7}	—	June 24, 2004	Campo Imperatore	CINEOS	·	1.8 km	MPC · JPL
268014	2004 NR	—	July 6, 2004	Campo Imperatore	CINEOS	·	1.7 km	MPC · JPL
268015	2004 NR_{7}	—	July 14, 2004	Socorro	LINEAR	·	2.5 km	MPC · JPL
268016	2004 NC_{8}	—	July 11, 2004	Socorro	LINEAR	·	1.4 km	MPC · JPL
268017	2004 NO_{10}	—	July 9, 2004	Socorro	LINEAR	NYS	1.7 km	MPC · JPL
268018	2004 NU_{12}	—	July 11, 2004	Socorro	LINEAR	·	1.6 km	MPC · JPL
268019	2004 NC_{15}	—	July 11, 2004	Socorro	LINEAR	H	620 m	MPC · JPL
268020	2004 NV_{21}	—	July 15, 2004	Socorro	LINEAR	JUN	1.5 km	MPC · JPL
268021	2004 NU_{24}	—	July 15, 2004	Socorro	LINEAR	EUN	1.8 km	MPC · JPL
268022	2004 NL_{26}	—	July 11, 2004	Socorro	LINEAR	·	3.2 km	MPC · JPL
268023	2004 NA_{28}	—	July 11, 2004	Socorro	LINEAR	·	2.1 km	MPC · JPL
268024	2004 NP_{30}	—	July 9, 2004	Anderson Mesa	LONEOS	NYS	1.8 km	MPC · JPL
268025	2004 NS_{32}	—	July 15, 2004	Socorro	LINEAR	H	620 m	MPC · JPL
268026	2004 NF_{33}	—	July 12, 2004	Palomar	NEAT	H	650 m	MPC · JPL
268027	2004 OJ_{5}	—	July 16, 2004	Socorro	LINEAR	·	1.4 km	MPC · JPL
268028	2004 OD_{11}	—	July 25, 2004	Anderson Mesa	LONEOS	BAR	2.1 km	MPC · JPL
268029	2004 PB_{5}	—	August 6, 2004	Palomar	NEAT	·	2.3 km	MPC · JPL
268030	2004 PE_{9}	—	August 6, 2004	Palomar	NEAT	·	1.8 km	MPC · JPL
268031	2004 PL_{13}	—	August 7, 2004	Palomar	NEAT	·	1.9 km	MPC · JPL
268032	2004 PL_{16}	—	August 7, 2004	Palomar	NEAT	EUN	1.9 km	MPC · JPL
268033	2004 PT_{19}	—	August 8, 2004	Anderson Mesa	LONEOS	·	2.9 km	MPC · JPL
268034	2004 PQ_{36}	—	August 9, 2004	Socorro	LINEAR	·	3.2 km	MPC · JPL
268035	2004 PF_{40}	—	August 9, 2004	Socorro	LINEAR	EUN	1.7 km	MPC · JPL
268036	2004 PS_{68}	—	August 7, 2004	Campo Imperatore	CINEOS	ADE	3.8 km	MPC · JPL
268037	2004 PL_{75}	—	August 8, 2004	Anderson Mesa	LONEOS	H	900 m	MPC · JPL
268038	2004 PZ_{88}	—	August 8, 2004	Anderson Mesa	LONEOS	·	3.1 km	MPC · JPL
268039	2004 PD_{91}	—	August 11, 2004	Socorro	LINEAR	·	1.9 km	MPC · JPL
268040	2004 PJ_{94}	—	August 10, 2004	Socorro	LINEAR	·	1.7 km	MPC · JPL
268041	2004 PY_{105}	—	August 15, 2004	Siding Spring	SSS	·	2.0 km	MPC · JPL
268042	2004 QX	—	August 16, 2004	Palomar	NEAT	·	2.0 km	MPC · JPL
268043	2004 QM_{3}	—	August 17, 2004	Socorro	LINEAR	·	2.5 km	MPC · JPL
268044	2004 QS_{4}	—	August 21, 2004	Siding Spring	SSS	H	730 m	MPC · JPL
268045	2004 QZ_{9}	—	August 21, 2004	Siding Spring	SSS	·	2.2 km	MPC · JPL
268046	2004 QJ_{11}	—	August 21, 2004	Siding Spring	SSS	·	1.8 km	MPC · JPL
268047	2004 QM_{21}	—	August 23, 2004	Kitt Peak	Spacewatch	(5)	1.7 km	MPC · JPL
268048	2004 QZ_{21}	—	August 26, 2004	Catalina	CSS	·	3.7 km	MPC · JPL
268049	2004 QK_{24}	—	August 26, 2004	Goodricke-Pigott	R. A. Tucker	·	4.8 km	MPC · JPL
268050	2004 QZ_{24}	—	August 24, 2004	Siding Spring	SSS	·	4.4 km	MPC · JPL
268051	2004 QZ_{28}	—	August 21, 2004	Siding Spring	SSS	·	3.6 km	MPC · JPL
268052	2004 RH	—	September 2, 2004	Kleť	Kleť	AGN	1.5 km	MPC · JPL
268053	2004 RV_{1}	—	September 5, 2004	Kleť	Kleť	·	1.8 km	MPC · JPL
268054	2004 RV_{18}	—	September 7, 2004	Kitt Peak	Spacewatch	·	1.5 km	MPC · JPL
268055	2004 RO_{19}	—	September 7, 2004	Kitt Peak	Spacewatch	·	3.6 km	MPC · JPL
268056	2004 RS_{19}	—	September 7, 2004	Kitt Peak	Spacewatch	·	1.7 km	MPC · JPL
268057 Michaelkaschke	2004 RQ_{24}	Michaelkaschke	September 8, 2004	Kleť	KLENOT	HOF	4.1 km	MPC · JPL
268058	2004 RA_{32}	—	September 7, 2004	Socorro	LINEAR	·	1.8 km	MPC · JPL
268059	2004 RO_{32}	—	September 7, 2004	Socorro	LINEAR	NEM	3.6 km	MPC · JPL
268060	2004 RH_{45}	—	September 8, 2004	Socorro	LINEAR	·	2.4 km	MPC · JPL
268061	2004 RP_{47}	—	September 8, 2004	Socorro	LINEAR	·	2.4 km	MPC · JPL
268062	2004 RS_{48}	—	September 8, 2004	Socorro	LINEAR	·	1.9 km	MPC · JPL
268063	2004 RP_{50}	—	September 8, 2004	Socorro	LINEAR	MIS	3.3 km	MPC · JPL
268064	2004 RZ_{50}	—	September 8, 2004	Socorro	LINEAR	·	4.4 km	MPC · JPL
268065	2004 RA_{53}	—	September 8, 2004	Socorro	LINEAR	·	2.5 km	MPC · JPL
268066	2004 RP_{59}	—	September 8, 2004	Socorro	LINEAR	EUN	2.1 km	MPC · JPL
268067	2004 RG_{63}	—	September 8, 2004	Socorro	LINEAR	·	3.0 km	MPC · JPL
268068	2004 RM_{64}	—	September 8, 2004	Socorro	LINEAR	·	1.6 km	MPC · JPL
268069	2004 RG_{65}	—	September 8, 2004	Socorro	LINEAR	·	2.6 km	MPC · JPL
268070	2004 RH_{69}	—	September 8, 2004	Socorro	LINEAR	·	2.1 km	MPC · JPL
268071	2004 RW_{69}	—	September 8, 2004	Socorro	LINEAR	·	2.4 km	MPC · JPL
268072	2004 RF_{73}	—	September 8, 2004	Socorro	LINEAR	·	1.8 km	MPC · JPL
268073	2004 RL_{78}	—	September 8, 2004	Socorro	LINEAR	·	2.6 km	MPC · JPL
268074	2004 RR_{81}	—	September 8, 2004	Socorro	LINEAR	·	2.2 km	MPC · JPL
268075	2004 RU_{85}	—	September 6, 2004	Siding Spring	SSS	·	1.6 km	MPC · JPL
268076	2004 RF_{89}	—	September 8, 2004	Socorro	LINEAR	H	770 m	MPC · JPL
268077	2004 RF_{104}	—	September 8, 2004	Palomar	NEAT	·	2.3 km	MPC · JPL
268078	2004 RH_{108}	—	September 9, 2004	Kitt Peak	Spacewatch	GEF	1.4 km	MPC · JPL
268079	2004 RP_{110}	—	September 11, 2004	Socorro	LINEAR	H	710 m	MPC · JPL
268080	2004 RB_{130}	—	September 7, 2004	Kitt Peak	Spacewatch	AST	2.7 km	MPC · JPL
268081	2004 RV_{135}	—	September 7, 2004	Kitt Peak	Spacewatch	·	1.7 km	MPC · JPL
268082	2004 RL_{139}	—	September 8, 2004	Socorro	LINEAR	·	2.4 km	MPC · JPL
268083	2004 RB_{147}	—	September 9, 2004	Socorro	LINEAR	·	1.8 km	MPC · JPL
268084	2004 RZ_{148}	—	September 9, 2004	Socorro	LINEAR	·	1.9 km	MPC · JPL
268085	2004 RS_{150}	—	September 9, 2004	Socorro	LINEAR	·	2.4 km	MPC · JPL
268086	2004 RD_{158}	—	September 10, 2004	Socorro	LINEAR	EUN	1.7 km	MPC · JPL
268087	2004 RL_{160}	—	September 10, 2004	Socorro	LINEAR	·	2.0 km	MPC · JPL
268088	2004 RX_{182}	—	September 10, 2004	Socorro	LINEAR	BRA	2.3 km	MPC · JPL
268089	2004 RV_{219}	—	September 11, 2004	Socorro	LINEAR	·	3.9 km	MPC · JPL
268090	2004 RF_{229}	—	September 9, 2004	Kitt Peak	Spacewatch	·	2.8 km	MPC · JPL
268091	2004 RK_{231}	—	September 9, 2004	Kitt Peak	Spacewatch	·	1.5 km	MPC · JPL
268092	2004 RU_{233}	—	September 9, 2004	Kitt Peak	Spacewatch	HOF	3.0 km	MPC · JPL
268093	2004 RD_{256}	—	September 7, 2004	Socorro	LINEAR	·	2.6 km	MPC · JPL
268094	2004 RU_{256}	—	September 9, 2004	Socorro	LINEAR	·	1.5 km	MPC · JPL
268095	2004 RJ_{257}	—	September 9, 2004	Apache Point	Apache Point	·	3.6 km	MPC · JPL
268096	2004 RY_{257}	—	September 10, 2004	Socorro	LINEAR	EUN	1.8 km	MPC · JPL
268097	2004 RM_{258}	—	September 10, 2004	Kitt Peak	Spacewatch	·	2.0 km	MPC · JPL
268098	2004 RH_{289}	—	September 15, 2004	Socorro	LINEAR	·	5.0 km	MPC · JPL
268099	2004 RU_{307}	—	September 13, 2004	Socorro	LINEAR	·	2.2 km	MPC · JPL
268100	2004 RK_{310}	—	September 13, 2004	Palomar	NEAT	PAD	2.9 km	MPC · JPL

== 268101–268200 ==
back to top

Designation			Discovery			Properties		Ref
Permanent	Provisional	Named after	Date	Site	Discoverer(s)	Category	Diam.	Ref
268101	2004 RA_{321}	—	September 13, 2004	Socorro	LINEAR	·	3.0 km	MPC · JPL
268102	2004 RQ_{337}	—	September 15, 2004	Kitt Peak	Spacewatch	AGN	1.4 km	MPC · JPL
268103	2004 RA_{342}	—	September 9, 2004	Socorro	LINEAR	·	2.4 km	MPC · JPL
268104	2004 RX_{343}	—	September 8, 2004	Palomar	NEAT	·	3.7 km	MPC · JPL
268105	2004 RJ_{355}	—	September 11, 2004	Kitt Peak	Spacewatch	NEM	2.1 km	MPC · JPL
268106	2004 SG_{4}	—	September 17, 2004	Kitt Peak	Spacewatch	EUN	1.7 km	MPC · JPL
268107	2004 SL_{11}	—	September 16, 2004	Siding Spring	SSS	GEF	2.1 km	MPC · JPL
268108	2004 SC_{23}	—	September 17, 2004	Kitt Peak	Spacewatch	·	2.5 km	MPC · JPL
268109	2004 SP_{27}	—	September 16, 2004	Kitt Peak	Spacewatch	EUN	1.5 km	MPC · JPL
268110	2004 SC_{55}	—	September 22, 2004	Socorro	LINEAR	·	5.5 km	MPC · JPL
268111	2004 SW_{56}	—	September 16, 2004	Anderson Mesa	LONEOS	·	3.7 km	MPC · JPL
268112	2004 SW_{61}	—	September 17, 2004	Bergisch Gladbach	W. Bickel	·	2.4 km	MPC · JPL
268113	2004 TG_{1}	—	October 3, 2004	Goodricke-Pigott	R. A. Tucker	HOF	3.7 km	MPC · JPL
268114	2004 TM_{8}	—	October 5, 2004	Anderson Mesa	LONEOS	H	770 m	MPC · JPL
268115 Williamalbrecht	2004 TK_{9}	Williamalbrecht	October 7, 2004	Sonoita	W. R. Cooney Jr., Gross, J.	·	2.5 km	MPC · JPL
268116	2004 TL_{12}	—	October 6, 2004	Palomar	NEAT	EUN	1.5 km	MPC · JPL
268117	2004 TW_{13}	—	October 4, 2004	Apache Point	Barentine, J. C., Esquerdo, G. A.	·	2.5 km	MPC · JPL
268118	2004 TL_{22}	—	October 4, 2004	Kitt Peak	Spacewatch	·	2.1 km	MPC · JPL
268119	2004 TN_{23}	—	October 4, 2004	Kitt Peak	Spacewatch	·	2.1 km	MPC · JPL
268120	2004 TQ_{24}	—	October 4, 2004	Kitt Peak	Spacewatch	·	3.0 km	MPC · JPL
268121	2004 TZ_{31}	—	October 4, 2004	Kitt Peak	Spacewatch	·	2.2 km	MPC · JPL
268122	2004 TJ_{50}	—	October 4, 2004	Kitt Peak	Spacewatch	·	2.7 km	MPC · JPL
268123	2004 TV_{64}	—	October 5, 2004	Kitt Peak	Spacewatch	AGN	1.7 km	MPC · JPL
268124	2004 TG_{69}	—	October 5, 2004	Anderson Mesa	LONEOS	·	2.7 km	MPC · JPL
268125	2004 TM_{85}	—	October 5, 2004	Kitt Peak	Spacewatch	·	2.0 km	MPC · JPL
268126	2004 TW_{85}	—	October 5, 2004	Kitt Peak	Spacewatch	HOF	2.8 km	MPC · JPL
268127	2004 TH_{93}	—	October 5, 2004	Kitt Peak	Spacewatch	KOR	1.4 km	MPC · JPL
268128	2004 TJ_{94}	—	October 5, 2004	Kitt Peak	Spacewatch	·	2.0 km	MPC · JPL
268129	2004 TM_{94}	—	October 5, 2004	Kitt Peak	Spacewatch	KOR	1.3 km	MPC · JPL
268130	2004 TB_{109}	—	October 7, 2004	Socorro	LINEAR	·	2.5 km	MPC · JPL
268131	2004 TX_{117}	—	October 5, 2004	Anderson Mesa	LONEOS	·	4.9 km	MPC · JPL
268132	2004 TO_{118}	—	October 5, 2004	Palomar	NEAT	·	1.5 km	MPC · JPL
268133	2004 TZ_{121}	—	October 7, 2004	Anderson Mesa	LONEOS	·	2.9 km	MPC · JPL
268134	2004 TS_{126}	—	October 7, 2004	Socorro	LINEAR	·	2.4 km	MPC · JPL
268135	2004 TR_{147}	—	October 6, 2004	Kitt Peak	Spacewatch	·	2.1 km	MPC · JPL
268136	2004 TY_{150}	—	October 6, 2004	Kitt Peak	Spacewatch	KOR	1.3 km	MPC · JPL
268137	2004 TX_{151}	—	October 6, 2004	Kitt Peak	Spacewatch	·	2.0 km	MPC · JPL
268138	2004 TO_{158}	—	October 6, 2004	Kitt Peak	Spacewatch	·	3.1 km	MPC · JPL
268139	2004 TY_{177}	—	October 7, 2004	Kitt Peak	Spacewatch	·	2.2 km	MPC · JPL
268140	2004 TD_{199}	—	October 7, 2004	Kitt Peak	Spacewatch	·	2.1 km	MPC · JPL
268141	2004 TL_{209}	—	October 8, 2004	Kitt Peak	Spacewatch	·	1.8 km	MPC · JPL
268142	2004 TN_{219}	—	October 5, 2004	Kitt Peak	Spacewatch	·	2.0 km	MPC · JPL
268143	2004 TQ_{224}	—	October 8, 2004	Kitt Peak	Spacewatch	·	1.8 km	MPC · JPL
268144	2004 TB_{225}	—	October 8, 2004	Kitt Peak	Spacewatch	HOF	2.9 km	MPC · JPL
268145	2004 TX_{225}	—	October 8, 2004	Kitt Peak	Spacewatch	HOF	3.0 km	MPC · JPL
268146	2004 TJ_{239}	—	October 9, 2004	Kitt Peak	Spacewatch	·	2.3 km	MPC · JPL
268147	2004 TD_{244}	—	October 7, 2004	Anderson Mesa	LONEOS	·	1.6 km	MPC · JPL
268148	2004 TY_{249}	—	October 7, 2004	Anderson Mesa	LONEOS	·	2.6 km	MPC · JPL
268149	2004 TJ_{254}	—	October 9, 2004	Kitt Peak	Spacewatch	·	2.0 km	MPC · JPL
268150	2004 TS_{278}	—	October 9, 2004	Kitt Peak	Spacewatch	HOF	4.6 km	MPC · JPL
268151	2004 TT_{285}	—	October 8, 2004	Socorro	LINEAR	·	4.0 km	MPC · JPL
268152	2004 TJ_{301}	—	October 8, 2004	Socorro	LINEAR	BRA	2.4 km	MPC · JPL
268153	2004 TW_{323}	—	October 11, 2004	Kitt Peak	Spacewatch	·	2.1 km	MPC · JPL
268154	2004 TW_{332}	—	October 9, 2004	Kitt Peak	Spacewatch	KOR	1.4 km	MPC · JPL
268155	2004 TO_{333}	—	October 9, 2004	Kitt Peak	Spacewatch	·	1.5 km	MPC · JPL
268156	2004 TF_{334}	—	October 9, 2004	Kitt Peak	Spacewatch	AST	2.0 km	MPC · JPL
268157	2004 TD_{351}	—	October 10, 2004	Kitt Peak	Spacewatch	AGN	1.8 km	MPC · JPL
268158	2004 TR_{355}	—	October 7, 2004	Socorro	LINEAR	·	2.3 km	MPC · JPL
268159	2004 TE_{356}	—	October 10, 2004	Palomar	NEAT	·	3.2 km	MPC · JPL
268160	2004 TN_{357}	—	October 6, 2004	Kitt Peak	Spacewatch	EUN	1.5 km	MPC · JPL
268161	2004 TS_{358}	—	October 5, 2004	Kitt Peak	Spacewatch	·	1.9 km	MPC · JPL
268162	2004 UF_{8}	—	October 21, 2004	Socorro	LINEAR	·	2.2 km	MPC · JPL
268163	2004 VB_{1}	—	November 4, 2004	Desert Eagle	W. K. Y. Yeung	·	2.7 km	MPC · JPL
268164	2004 VC_{8}	—	November 3, 2004	Kitt Peak	Spacewatch	·	1.8 km	MPC · JPL
268165	2004 VA_{12}	—	November 3, 2004	Palomar	NEAT	·	2.9 km	MPC · JPL
268166	2004 VN_{26}	—	November 4, 2004	Catalina	CSS	·	3.0 km	MPC · JPL
268167	2004 VB_{55}	—	November 10, 2004	Desert Eagle	W. K. Y. Yeung	·	3.3 km	MPC · JPL
268168	2004 VR_{61}	—	November 5, 2004	Palomar	NEAT	JUN	1.8 km	MPC · JPL
268169	2004 VP_{72}	—	November 9, 2004	Catalina	CSS	MRX	1.9 km	MPC · JPL
268170	2004 WK_{4}	—	November 17, 2004	Campo Imperatore	CINEOS	·	2.4 km	MPC · JPL
268171	2004 WF_{5}	—	November 18, 2004	Socorro	LINEAR	·	2.5 km	MPC · JPL
268172	2004 XN_{17}	—	December 3, 2004	Kitt Peak	Spacewatch	·	3.5 km	MPC · JPL
268173	2004 XS_{20}	—	December 8, 2004	Socorro	LINEAR	·	5.1 km	MPC · JPL
268174	2004 XN_{31}	—	December 9, 2004	Catalina	CSS	·	4.9 km	MPC · JPL
268175	2004 XO_{34}	—	December 11, 2004	Kitt Peak	Spacewatch	·	5.4 km	MPC · JPL
268176	2004 XO_{53}	—	December 10, 2004	Kitt Peak	Spacewatch	·	2.9 km	MPC · JPL
268177	2004 XF_{59}	—	December 10, 2004	Kitt Peak	Spacewatch	·	3.9 km	MPC · JPL
268178	2004 XW_{67}	—	December 3, 2004	Kitt Peak	Spacewatch	·	3.7 km	MPC · JPL
268179	2004 XE_{89}	—	December 10, 2004	Campo Imperatore	CINEOS	·	2.7 km	MPC · JPL
268180	2004 XK_{92}	—	December 11, 2004	Socorro	LINEAR	·	3.5 km	MPC · JPL
268181	2004 XU_{99}	—	December 12, 2004	Kitt Peak	Spacewatch	·	5.5 km	MPC · JPL
268182	2004 XE_{133}	—	December 14, 2004	Kitt Peak	Spacewatch	(31811)	3.8 km	MPC · JPL
268183	2004 XQ_{137}	—	December 4, 2004	Anderson Mesa	LONEOS	T_{j} (2.98) · EUP	6.1 km	MPC · JPL
268184	2004 XL_{146}	—	December 14, 2004	Socorro	LINEAR	EOS	3.7 km	MPC · JPL
268185	2004 XC_{147}	—	December 15, 2004	Socorro	LINEAR	·	3.1 km	MPC · JPL
268186	2004 XF_{179}	—	December 14, 2004	Campo Imperatore	CINEOS	·	2.7 km	MPC · JPL
268187	2004 YR_{4}	—	December 17, 2004	Socorro	LINEAR	·	4.5 km	MPC · JPL
268188	2004 YB_{6}	—	December 16, 2004	Kitt Peak	Spacewatch	·	3.9 km	MPC · JPL
268189	2004 YP_{22}	—	December 18, 2004	Mount Lemmon	Mount Lemmon Survey	·	3.0 km	MPC · JPL
268190	2004 YT_{22}	—	December 18, 2004	Mount Lemmon	Mount Lemmon Survey	·	3.7 km	MPC · JPL
268191	2005 AQ_{7}	—	January 6, 2005	Catalina	CSS	·	5.7 km	MPC · JPL
268192	2005 AU_{18}	—	January 8, 2005	Campo Imperatore	CINEOS	·	4.1 km	MPC · JPL
268193	2005 AF_{19}	—	January 8, 2005	Socorro	LINEAR	T_{j} (2.98)	4.0 km	MPC · JPL
268194	2005 AC_{30}	—	January 9, 2005	Catalina	CSS	·	5.2 km	MPC · JPL
268195	2005 AU_{34}	—	January 13, 2005	Kitt Peak	Spacewatch	·	2.9 km	MPC · JPL
268196	2005 AB_{35}	—	January 13, 2005	Socorro	LINEAR	·	3.0 km	MPC · JPL
268197	2005 AH_{36}	—	January 13, 2005	Socorro	LINEAR	EUP	5.4 km	MPC · JPL
268198	2005 AD_{38}	—	January 13, 2005	Catalina	CSS	·	3.9 km	MPC · JPL
268199	2005 AL_{40}	—	January 15, 2005	Socorro	LINEAR	·	6.1 km	MPC · JPL
268200	2005 AD_{45}	—	January 15, 2005	Kitt Peak	Spacewatch	·	4.4 km	MPC · JPL

== 268201–268300 ==
back to top

Designation			Discovery			Properties		Ref
Permanent	Provisional	Named after	Date	Site	Discoverer(s)	Category	Diam.	Ref
268201	2005 AK_{45}	—	January 15, 2005	Socorro	LINEAR	·	4.4 km	MPC · JPL
268202	2005 AS_{59}	—	January 15, 2005	Kitt Peak	Spacewatch	VER	3.2 km	MPC · JPL
268203	2005 AK_{65}	—	January 13, 2005	Kitt Peak	Spacewatch	VER	3.7 km	MPC · JPL
268204	2005 AG_{74}	—	January 15, 2005	Kitt Peak	Spacewatch	VER	4.2 km	MPC · JPL
268205	2005 AY_{81}	—	January 7, 2005	Catalina	CSS	·	4.1 km	MPC · JPL
268206	2005 BF_{11}	—	January 16, 2005	Kitt Peak	Spacewatch	·	5.7 km	MPC · JPL
268207	2005 BY_{16}	—	January 16, 2005	Socorro	LINEAR	·	3.8 km	MPC · JPL
268208	2005 BR_{17}	—	January 16, 2005	Kitt Peak	Spacewatch	·	3.0 km	MPC · JPL
268209	2005 BO_{21}	—	January 16, 2005	Kitt Peak	Spacewatch	·	4.4 km	MPC · JPL
268210	2005 BP_{23}	—	January 16, 2005	Kitt Peak	Spacewatch	·	4.4 km	MPC · JPL
268211	2005 BL_{48}	—	January 17, 2005	Kitt Peak	Spacewatch	·	3.4 km	MPC · JPL
268212	2005 BQ_{49}	—	January 17, 2005	Kitt Peak	Spacewatch	VER	3.4 km	MPC · JPL
268213	2005 CY	—	February 1, 2005	Catalina	CSS	T_{j} (2.99) · EUP	5.8 km	MPC · JPL
268214	2005 CY_{8}	—	February 1, 2005	Catalina	CSS	·	4.1 km	MPC · JPL
268215	2005 CG_{20}	—	February 2, 2005	Catalina	CSS	·	4.6 km	MPC · JPL
268216	2005 CF_{32}	—	February 1, 2005	Kitt Peak	Spacewatch	·	4.0 km	MPC · JPL
268217	2005 CR_{39}	—	February 7, 2005	Altschwendt	Altschwendt	CYB	4.9 km	MPC · JPL
268218	2005 CX_{39}	—	February 4, 2005	Kitt Peak	Spacewatch	·	3.2 km	MPC · JPL
268219	2005 CK_{46}	—	February 2, 2005	Kitt Peak	Spacewatch	HYG	3.6 km	MPC · JPL
268220	2005 CO_{67}	—	February 1, 2005	Catalina	CSS	·	3.8 km	MPC · JPL
268221	2005 CD_{68}	—	February 2, 2005	Catalina	CSS	·	4.2 km	MPC · JPL
268222	2005 CZ_{73}	—	February 1, 2005	Kitt Peak	Spacewatch	·	4.5 km	MPC · JPL
268223	2005 EE_{3}	—	March 1, 2005	Kitt Peak	Spacewatch	·	3.8 km	MPC · JPL
268224	2005 ET_{13}	—	March 3, 2005	Kitt Peak	Spacewatch	·	4.9 km	MPC · JPL
268225	2005 EF_{22}	—	March 3, 2005	Catalina	CSS	·	3.7 km	MPC · JPL
268226	2005 EF_{24}	—	March 3, 2005	Catalina	CSS	·	4.0 km	MPC · JPL
268227	2005 ED_{30}	—	March 4, 2005	Gnosca	S. Sposetti	·	3.3 km	MPC · JPL
268228	2005 ES_{43}	—	March 3, 2005	Kitt Peak	Spacewatch	THM	3.6 km	MPC · JPL
268229	2005 EY_{50}	—	March 3, 2005	Catalina	CSS	·	4.7 km	MPC · JPL
268230	2005 EL_{72}	—	March 2, 2005	Catalina	CSS	·	5.0 km	MPC · JPL
268231	2005 EO_{89}	—	March 8, 2005	Socorro	LINEAR	·	5.4 km	MPC · JPL
268232	2005 EH_{136}	—	March 9, 2005	Anderson Mesa	LONEOS	CYB	8.2 km	MPC · JPL
268233	2005 EQ_{170}	—	March 7, 2005	Socorro	LINEAR	·	6.8 km	MPC · JPL
268234	2005 EA_{220}	—	March 10, 2005	Siding Spring	SSS	EUP	4.7 km	MPC · JPL
268235	2005 ER_{223}	—	March 12, 2005	Kitt Peak	Spacewatch	·	3.6 km	MPC · JPL
268236	2005 EA_{228}	—	March 10, 2005	Mount Lemmon	Mount Lemmon Survey	EOS	2.7 km	MPC · JPL
268237	2005 GQ_{50}	—	April 5, 2005	Kitt Peak	Spacewatch	·	1.1 km	MPC · JPL
268238	2005 GA_{63}	—	April 2, 2005	Mount Lemmon	Mount Lemmon Survey	HYG	3.9 km	MPC · JPL
268239	2005 GT_{107}	—	April 10, 2005	Mount Lemmon	Mount Lemmon Survey	fast	3.5 km	MPC · JPL
268240	2005 GW_{181}	—	April 12, 2005	Kitt Peak	Spacewatch	·	6.0 km	MPC · JPL
268241	2005 HC_{6}	—	April 30, 2005	Kitt Peak	Spacewatch	·	870 m	MPC · JPL
268242 Pebble	2005 JW_{1}	Pebble	May 4, 2005	Haleakala	Bedient, J.	·	870 m	MPC · JPL
268243	2005 JH_{117}	—	May 10, 2005	Kitt Peak	Spacewatch	·	900 m	MPC · JPL
268244	2005 JP_{143}	—	May 15, 2005	Mount Lemmon	Mount Lemmon Survey	·	660 m	MPC · JPL
268245	2005 LR_{41}	—	June 12, 2005	Kitt Peak	Spacewatch	·	2.5 km	MPC · JPL
268246	2005 MQ_{2}	—	June 17, 2005	Mount Lemmon	Mount Lemmon Survey	·	1.9 km	MPC · JPL
268247	2005 MT_{5}	—	June 27, 2005	Kitt Peak	Spacewatch	·	920 m	MPC · JPL
268248	2005 MU_{18}	—	June 28, 2005	Palomar	NEAT	·	820 m	MPC · JPL
268249	2005 ML_{20}	—	June 30, 2005	Kitt Peak	Spacewatch	·	970 m	MPC · JPL
268250	2005 MS_{20}	—	June 30, 2005	Kitt Peak	Spacewatch	·	1.2 km	MPC · JPL
268251	2005 MF_{24}	—	June 28, 2005	Kitt Peak	Spacewatch	·	870 m	MPC · JPL
268252	2005 MD_{27}	—	June 29, 2005	Kitt Peak	Spacewatch	·	1.5 km	MPC · JPL
268253	2005 MT_{33}	—	June 29, 2005	Kitt Peak	Spacewatch	·	810 m	MPC · JPL
268254	2005 MO_{41}	—	June 30, 2005	Kitt Peak	Spacewatch	·	1.4 km	MPC · JPL
268255	2005 NJ_{10}	—	July 3, 2005	Mount Lemmon	Mount Lemmon Survey	·	900 m	MPC · JPL
268256	2005 NO_{19}	—	July 5, 2005	Mount Lemmon	Mount Lemmon Survey	MAS	820 m	MPC · JPL
268257	2005 NA_{21}	—	July 6, 2005	Reedy Creek	J. Broughton	·	1.7 km	MPC · JPL
268258	2005 NN_{35}	—	July 5, 2005	Kitt Peak	Spacewatch	·	1.2 km	MPC · JPL
268259	2005 NG_{43}	—	July 5, 2005	Palomar	NEAT	·	870 m	MPC · JPL
268260	2005 NJ_{49}	—	July 10, 2005	Vail-Jarnac	Jarnac	·	1.0 km	MPC · JPL
268261	2005 NS_{60}	—	July 10, 2005	Kitt Peak	Spacewatch	·	1.1 km	MPC · JPL
268262	2005 NM_{85}	—	July 3, 2005	Mount Lemmon	Mount Lemmon Survey	MAS	950 m	MPC · JPL
268263	2005 NE_{123}	—	July 6, 2005	Siding Spring	SSS	·	2.1 km	MPC · JPL
268264	2005 NS_{124}	—	July 8, 2005	Kitt Peak	Spacewatch	·	1.1 km	MPC · JPL
268265	2005 OF_{5}	—	July 28, 2005	Palomar	NEAT	·	1.1 km	MPC · JPL
268266	2005 OJ_{8}	—	July 26, 2005	Palomar	NEAT	·	1.0 km	MPC · JPL
268267	2005 OQ_{9}	—	July 27, 2005	Palomar	NEAT	·	1.5 km	MPC · JPL
268268	2005 OJ_{18}	—	July 30, 2005	Palomar	NEAT	·	960 m	MPC · JPL
268269	2005 OB_{21}	—	July 28, 2005	Palomar	NEAT	V	800 m	MPC · JPL
268270	2005 OC_{22}	—	July 29, 2005	Palomar	NEAT	V	860 m	MPC · JPL
268271	2005 OF_{22}	—	July 29, 2005	Siding Spring	SSS	·	1.3 km	MPC · JPL
268272	2005 OA_{29}	—	July 30, 2005	Palomar	NEAT	·	1.8 km	MPC · JPL
268273	2005 PA_{1}	—	August 1, 2005	Siding Spring	SSS	·	2.2 km	MPC · JPL
268274	2005 PH_{6}	—	August 7, 2005	Reedy Creek	J. Broughton	·	2.1 km	MPC · JPL
268275	2005 PP_{7}	—	August 4, 2005	Palomar	NEAT	·	1.8 km	MPC · JPL
268276	2005 PA_{11}	—	August 4, 2005	Palomar	NEAT	·	960 m	MPC · JPL
268277	2005 PB_{22}	—	August 6, 2005	Palomar	NEAT	·	1.5 km	MPC · JPL
268278	2005 PX_{23}	—	August 8, 2005	Cerro Tololo	M. W. Buie	·	1.7 km	MPC · JPL
268279	2005 QL_{4}	—	August 24, 2005	Palomar	NEAT	·	860 m	MPC · JPL
268280	2005 QG_{5}	—	August 22, 2005	Palomar	NEAT	·	1.7 km	MPC · JPL
268281	2005 QW_{8}	—	August 25, 2005	Palomar	NEAT	V	780 m	MPC · JPL
268282	2005 QV_{26}	—	August 27, 2005	Kitt Peak	Spacewatch	·	1.4 km	MPC · JPL
268283	2005 QF_{29}	—	August 24, 2005	Palomar	NEAT	·	1.5 km	MPC · JPL
268284	2005 QM_{31}	—	August 22, 2005	Haleakala	NEAT	·	2.6 km	MPC · JPL
268285	2005 QH_{36}	—	August 25, 2005	Palomar	NEAT	·	1.9 km	MPC · JPL
268286	2005 QE_{41}	—	August 26, 2005	Anderson Mesa	LONEOS	·	2.8 km	MPC · JPL
268287	2005 QW_{44}	—	August 26, 2005	Palomar	NEAT	·	1.7 km	MPC · JPL
268288	2005 QZ_{46}	—	August 26, 2005	Palomar	NEAT	MAS	810 m	MPC · JPL
268289	2005 QH_{53}	—	August 28, 2005	Kitt Peak	Spacewatch	·	2.4 km	MPC · JPL
268290	2005 QE_{62}	—	August 26, 2005	Palomar	NEAT	·	1.4 km	MPC · JPL
268291	2005 QX_{71}	—	August 29, 2005	Anderson Mesa	LONEOS	·	1.2 km	MPC · JPL
268292	2005 QN_{74}	—	August 29, 2005	Anderson Mesa	LONEOS	·	1.6 km	MPC · JPL
268293	2005 QW_{79}	—	August 27, 2005	Siding Spring	SSS	·	1.8 km	MPC · JPL
268294	2005 QE_{82}	—	August 29, 2005	Anderson Mesa	LONEOS	·	1.4 km	MPC · JPL
268295	2005 QJ_{83}	—	August 29, 2005	Anderson Mesa	LONEOS	V	820 m	MPC · JPL
268296	2005 QG_{86}	—	August 30, 2005	Kitt Peak	Spacewatch	·	1.8 km	MPC · JPL
268297	2005 QL_{87}	—	August 31, 2005	Socorro	LINEAR	·	1.2 km	MPC · JPL
268298	2005 QW_{88}	—	August 30, 2005	St. Véran	St. Veran	·	1.6 km	MPC · JPL
268299	2005 QJ_{92}	—	August 26, 2005	Anderson Mesa	LONEOS	MAS	700 m	MPC · JPL
268300	2005 QN_{94}	—	August 27, 2005	Palomar	NEAT	·	1.2 km	MPC · JPL

== 268301–268400 ==
back to top

Designation			Discovery			Properties		Ref
Permanent	Provisional	Named after	Date	Site	Discoverer(s)	Category	Diam.	Ref
268301	2005 QT_{97}	—	August 27, 2005	Palomar	NEAT	·	1.1 km	MPC · JPL
268302	2005 QT_{110}	—	August 27, 2005	Palomar	NEAT	·	1.5 km	MPC · JPL
268303	2005 QS_{111}	—	August 27, 2005	Palomar	NEAT	·	1.5 km	MPC · JPL
268304	2005 QM_{113}	—	August 27, 2005	Palomar	NEAT	·	1.1 km	MPC · JPL
268305	2005 QV_{114}	—	August 27, 2005	Palomar	NEAT	V	910 m	MPC · JPL
268306	2005 QJ_{123}	—	August 28, 2005	Kitt Peak	Spacewatch	·	1.5 km	MPC · JPL
268307	2005 QX_{128}	—	August 28, 2005	Kitt Peak	Spacewatch	MAS	900 m	MPC · JPL
268308	2005 QS_{135}	—	August 28, 2005	Kitt Peak	Spacewatch	·	1.1 km	MPC · JPL
268309	2005 QR_{136}	—	August 28, 2005	Kitt Peak	Spacewatch	NYS	1.4 km	MPC · JPL
268310	2005 QZ_{136}	—	August 28, 2005	Kitt Peak	Spacewatch	BAR	1.3 km	MPC · JPL
268311	2005 QU_{140}	—	August 29, 2005	Socorro	LINEAR	V	930 m	MPC · JPL
268312	2005 QV_{141}	—	August 30, 2005	Kitt Peak	Spacewatch	·	1.4 km	MPC · JPL
268313	2005 QX_{146}	—	August 28, 2005	Siding Spring	SSS	NYS	1.3 km	MPC · JPL
268314	2005 QK_{152}	—	August 31, 2005	Kitt Peak	Spacewatch	PHO	1.1 km	MPC · JPL
268315	2005 QQ_{153}	—	August 27, 2005	Palomar	NEAT	·	1.9 km	MPC · JPL
268316	2005 QV_{159}	—	August 28, 2005	Anderson Mesa	LONEOS	PHO	1.6 km	MPC · JPL
268317	2005 QO_{161}	—	August 28, 2005	Siding Spring	SSS	(1338) (FLO)	1.1 km	MPC · JPL
268318	2005 QX_{161}	—	August 28, 2005	Siding Spring	SSS	·	950 m	MPC · JPL
268319	2005 QR_{166}	—	August 26, 2005	Palomar	NEAT	·	6.5 km	MPC · JPL
268320	2005 RB_{30}	—	September 9, 2005	Socorro	LINEAR	NYS	1.2 km	MPC · JPL
268321	2005 RP_{45}	—	September 1, 2005	Kitt Peak	Spacewatch	·	1.6 km	MPC · JPL
268322	2005 RR_{45}	—	September 9, 2005	Apache Point	A. C. Becker	MAS	820 m	MPC · JPL
268323	2005 SN_{14}	—	September 25, 2005	Catalina	CSS	·	2.9 km	MPC · JPL
268324	2005 SP_{17}	—	September 26, 2005	Kitt Peak	Spacewatch	·	1.2 km	MPC · JPL
268325	2005 SS_{23}	—	September 23, 2005	Catalina	CSS	·	2.5 km	MPC · JPL
268326	2005 SE_{26}	—	September 24, 2005	Kitt Peak	Spacewatch	·	870 m	MPC · JPL
268327	2005 SU_{38}	—	September 24, 2005	Kitt Peak	Spacewatch	NYS	1.2 km	MPC · JPL
268328	2005 SG_{74}	—	September 24, 2005	Kitt Peak	Spacewatch	·	1.3 km	MPC · JPL
268329	2005 SH_{83}	—	September 24, 2005	Kitt Peak	Spacewatch	·	1.2 km	MPC · JPL
268330	2005 SX_{87}	—	September 24, 2005	Kitt Peak	Spacewatch	·	1.1 km	MPC · JPL
268331	2005 SL_{88}	—	September 24, 2005	Kitt Peak	Spacewatch	·	1.1 km	MPC · JPL
268332	2005 SM_{96}	—	September 25, 2005	Palomar	NEAT	·	1.3 km	MPC · JPL
268333	2005 SD_{99}	—	September 25, 2005	Kitt Peak	Spacewatch	(5)	1.6 km	MPC · JPL
268334	2005 SD_{101}	—	September 25, 2005	Kitt Peak	Spacewatch	·	1.4 km	MPC · JPL
268335	2005 SA_{104}	—	September 25, 2005	Palomar	NEAT	·	2.0 km	MPC · JPL
268336	2005 ST_{114}	—	September 27, 2005	Kitt Peak	Spacewatch	NYS	1.6 km	MPC · JPL
268337	2005 SK_{133}	—	September 29, 2005	Kitt Peak	Spacewatch	·	1.8 km	MPC · JPL
268338	2005 SK_{150}	—	September 25, 2005	Kitt Peak	Spacewatch	ERI	1.6 km	MPC · JPL
268339	2005 SQ_{150}	—	September 25, 2005	Kitt Peak	Spacewatch	·	1.5 km	MPC · JPL
268340	2005 SF_{155}	—	September 26, 2005	Socorro	LINEAR	·	1.7 km	MPC · JPL
268341	2005 SR_{162}	—	September 27, 2005	Socorro	LINEAR	V	990 m	MPC · JPL
268342	2005 SW_{163}	—	September 27, 2005	Palomar	NEAT	V	900 m	MPC · JPL
268343	2005 SP_{176}	—	September 29, 2005	Kitt Peak	Spacewatch	·	1.3 km	MPC · JPL
268344	2005 SD_{178}	—	September 29, 2005	Kitt Peak	Spacewatch	·	1.3 km	MPC · JPL
268345	2005 SK_{212}	—	September 30, 2005	Mount Lemmon	Mount Lemmon Survey	·	1.4 km	MPC · JPL
268346	2005 SV_{236}	—	September 29, 2005	Kitt Peak	Spacewatch	NYS	1.1 km	MPC · JPL
268347	2005 SZ_{244}	—	September 30, 2005	Mount Lemmon	Mount Lemmon Survey	·	1.1 km	MPC · JPL
268348	2005 SG_{246}	—	September 30, 2005	Mount Lemmon	Mount Lemmon Survey	·	1.5 km	MPC · JPL
268349	2005 SU_{247}	—	September 30, 2005	Kitt Peak	Spacewatch	·	1.1 km	MPC · JPL
268350	2005 SS_{251}	—	September 24, 2005	Palomar	NEAT	NYS	1.5 km	MPC · JPL
268351	2005 SV_{253}	—	September 22, 2005	Palomar	NEAT	V	740 m	MPC · JPL
268352	2005 SC_{256}	—	September 22, 2005	Palomar	NEAT	NYS ·	2.5 km	MPC · JPL
268353	2005 SS_{278}	—	September 30, 2005	Mount Lemmon	Mount Lemmon Survey	·	1.3 km	MPC · JPL
268354	2005 TX_{4}	—	October 1, 2005	Mount Lemmon	Mount Lemmon Survey	NYS	1.5 km	MPC · JPL
268355	2005 TK_{7}	—	October 1, 2005	Catalina	CSS	·	2.2 km	MPC · JPL
268356	2005 TR_{23}	—	October 1, 2005	Catalina	CSS	·	1.8 km	MPC · JPL
268357	2005 TD_{27}	—	October 1, 2005	Mount Lemmon	Mount Lemmon Survey	·	1.3 km	MPC · JPL
268358	2005 TH_{29}	—	October 2, 2005	Mount Lemmon	Mount Lemmon Survey	·	1.3 km	MPC · JPL
268359	2005 TO_{29}	—	October 2, 2005	Catalina	CSS	ADE	2.6 km	MPC · JPL
268360	2005 TG_{32}	—	October 1, 2005	Kitt Peak	Spacewatch	·	1.2 km	MPC · JPL
268361	2005 TD_{42}	—	October 3, 2005	Catalina	CSS	·	1.7 km	MPC · JPL
268362	2005 TG_{85}	—	October 3, 2005	Kitt Peak	Spacewatch	·	1.1 km	MPC · JPL
268363	2005 TX_{99}	—	October 7, 2005	Socorro	LINEAR	·	2.4 km	MPC · JPL
268364	2005 TS_{114}	—	October 7, 2005	Kitt Peak	Spacewatch	NYS	1.5 km	MPC · JPL
268365	2005 TB_{119}	—	October 7, 2005	Kitt Peak	Spacewatch	·	1.2 km	MPC · JPL
268366	2005 TD_{119}	—	October 7, 2005	Kitt Peak	Spacewatch	·	1.7 km	MPC · JPL
268367	2005 TO_{121}	—	October 7, 2005	Catalina	CSS	NYS	1.1 km	MPC · JPL
268368	2005 TS_{125}	—	October 7, 2005	Kitt Peak	Spacewatch	(5)	1.1 km	MPC · JPL
268369	2005 TE_{136}	—	October 6, 2005	Kitt Peak	Spacewatch	(5)	1.0 km	MPC · JPL
268370	2005 TO_{141}	—	October 8, 2005	Kitt Peak	Spacewatch	(5)	1.1 km	MPC · JPL
268371	2005 TF_{149}	—	October 8, 2005	Kitt Peak	Spacewatch	·	1.4 km	MPC · JPL
268372	2005 TS_{150}	—	October 8, 2005	Kitt Peak	Spacewatch	NYS	1.5 km	MPC · JPL
268373	2005 TD_{163}	—	October 9, 2005	Kitt Peak	Spacewatch	(5)	1.2 km	MPC · JPL
268374	2005 TU_{164}	—	October 9, 2005	Kitt Peak	Spacewatch	·	1.3 km	MPC · JPL
268375	2005 TJ_{165}	—	October 9, 2005	Kitt Peak	Spacewatch	·	1.7 km	MPC · JPL
268376	2005 TC_{180}	—	October 1, 2005	Catalina	CSS	V	1.0 km	MPC · JPL
268377	2005 TP_{193}	—	October 1, 2005	Catalina	CSS	·	1.9 km	MPC · JPL
268378	2005 UH_{20}	—	October 22, 2005	Catalina	CSS	·	2.4 km	MPC · JPL
268379	2005 UH_{21}	—	October 23, 2005	Kitt Peak	Spacewatch	·	1.6 km	MPC · JPL
268380	2005 UN_{23}	—	October 23, 2005	Kitt Peak	Spacewatch	NYS	1.5 km	MPC · JPL
268381	2005 US_{26}	—	October 23, 2005	Catalina	CSS	·	1.9 km	MPC · JPL
268382	2005 UO_{50}	—	October 23, 2005	Catalina	CSS	(5)	1.7 km	MPC · JPL
268383	2005 UU_{56}	—	October 24, 2005	Anderson Mesa	LONEOS	·	1.8 km	MPC · JPL
268384	2005 UJ_{57}	—	October 24, 2005	Anderson Mesa	LONEOS	·	2.2 km	MPC · JPL
268385	2005 UV_{60}	—	October 25, 2005	Mount Lemmon	Mount Lemmon Survey	·	1.6 km	MPC · JPL
268386	2005 UE_{62}	—	October 25, 2005	Mount Lemmon	Mount Lemmon Survey	·	1.4 km	MPC · JPL
268387	2005 UW_{88}	—	October 22, 2005	Kitt Peak	Spacewatch	·	2.0 km	MPC · JPL
268388	2005 UK_{102}	—	October 22, 2005	Kitt Peak	Spacewatch	·	1.4 km	MPC · JPL
268389	2005 US_{123}	—	October 24, 2005	Kitt Peak	Spacewatch	·	1.4 km	MPC · JPL
268390	2005 UN_{129}	—	October 24, 2005	Kitt Peak	Spacewatch	·	2.0 km	MPC · JPL
268391	2005 UO_{133}	—	October 25, 2005	Mount Lemmon	Mount Lemmon Survey	V	860 m	MPC · JPL
268392	2005 UB_{143}	—	October 25, 2005	Mount Lemmon	Mount Lemmon Survey	·	1.3 km	MPC · JPL
268393	2005 UU_{146}	—	October 26, 2005	Kitt Peak	Spacewatch	·	1.6 km	MPC · JPL
268394	2005 UJ_{148}	—	October 26, 2005	Kitt Peak	Spacewatch	·	1.4 km	MPC · JPL
268395	2005 UR_{155}	—	October 26, 2005	Palomar	NEAT	·	1.2 km	MPC · JPL
268396	2005 UR_{156}	—	October 26, 2005	Kitt Peak	Spacewatch	·	1.7 km	MPC · JPL
268397	2005 UJ_{169}	—	October 24, 2005	Kitt Peak	Spacewatch	(5)	1.6 km	MPC · JPL
268398	2005 UG_{174}	—	October 24, 2005	Kitt Peak	Spacewatch	·	1.4 km	MPC · JPL
268399	2005 UW_{183}	—	October 25, 2005	Mount Lemmon	Mount Lemmon Survey	·	1.4 km	MPC · JPL
268400	2005 UE_{193}	—	October 22, 2005	Kitt Peak	Spacewatch	·	1.2 km	MPC · JPL

== 268401–268500 ==
back to top

Designation			Discovery			Properties		Ref
Permanent	Provisional	Named after	Date	Site	Discoverer(s)	Category	Diam.	Ref
268401	2005 UV_{193}	—	October 22, 2005	Kitt Peak	Spacewatch	·	1.1 km	MPC · JPL
268402	2005 UN_{201}	—	October 25, 2005	Kitt Peak	Spacewatch	·	1.2 km	MPC · JPL
268403	2005 UC_{202}	—	October 25, 2005	Kitt Peak	Spacewatch	·	1.4 km	MPC · JPL
268404	2005 UU_{205}	—	October 26, 2005	Kitt Peak	Spacewatch	·	1.6 km	MPC · JPL
268405	2005 UT_{226}	—	October 25, 2005	Kitt Peak	Spacewatch	·	1.5 km	MPC · JPL
268406	2005 UK_{236}	—	October 25, 2005	Kitt Peak	Spacewatch	NYS	1.4 km	MPC · JPL
268407	2005 UX_{239}	—	October 25, 2005	Kitt Peak	Spacewatch	·	1.7 km	MPC · JPL
268408	2005 UO_{283}	—	October 26, 2005	Kitt Peak	Spacewatch	(5)	1.1 km	MPC · JPL
268409	2005 UJ_{293}	—	October 26, 2005	Kitt Peak	Spacewatch	·	1.5 km	MPC · JPL
268410	2005 UJ_{307}	—	October 27, 2005	Mount Lemmon	Mount Lemmon Survey	·	1.4 km	MPC · JPL
268411	2005 UP_{308}	—	October 27, 2005	Mount Lemmon	Mount Lemmon Survey	·	1.6 km	MPC · JPL
268412	2005 UN_{313}	—	October 27, 2005	Socorro	LINEAR	·	1.6 km	MPC · JPL
268413	2005 UG_{314}	—	October 28, 2005	Catalina	CSS	PHO	1.8 km	MPC · JPL
268414	2005 UR_{320}	—	October 27, 2005	Kitt Peak	Spacewatch	·	1.8 km	MPC · JPL
268415	2005 UV_{352}	—	October 29, 2005	Catalina	CSS	ADE	2.5 km	MPC · JPL
268416	2005 UO_{363}	—	October 27, 2005	Kitt Peak	Spacewatch	·	1.3 km	MPC · JPL
268417	2005 UL_{373}	—	October 27, 2005	Kitt Peak	Spacewatch	·	1.7 km	MPC · JPL
268418	2005 UH_{391}	—	October 30, 2005	Mount Lemmon	Mount Lemmon Survey	·	1.1 km	MPC · JPL
268419	2005 UE_{399}	—	October 30, 2005	Mount Lemmon	Mount Lemmon Survey	·	1.7 km	MPC · JPL
268420	2005 UO_{421}	—	October 27, 2005	Mount Lemmon	Mount Lemmon Survey	·	1.1 km	MPC · JPL
268421	2005 UE_{470}	—	October 30, 2005	Kitt Peak	Spacewatch	HOF	3.6 km	MPC · JPL
268422	2005 UM_{475}	—	October 22, 2005	Kitt Peak	Spacewatch	·	2.5 km	MPC · JPL
268423	2005 UM_{483}	—	October 22, 2005	Catalina	CSS	(5)	1.3 km	MPC · JPL
268424	2005 UF_{484}	—	October 22, 2005	Catalina	CSS	(5)	1.3 km	MPC · JPL
268425	2005 UB_{491}	—	October 23, 2005	Palomar	NEAT	·	2.2 km	MPC · JPL
268426	2005 UZ_{493}	—	October 25, 2005	Catalina	CSS	·	1.9 km	MPC · JPL
268427	2005 UJ_{506}	—	October 24, 2005	Mauna Kea	D. J. Tholen	·	3.4 km	MPC · JPL
268428	2005 UU_{508}	—	October 24, 2005	Kitt Peak	Spacewatch	·	1.1 km	MPC · JPL
268429	2005 UL_{511}	—	October 27, 2005	Mount Lemmon	Mount Lemmon Survey	·	1.3 km	MPC · JPL
268430	2005 UM_{512}	—	October 30, 2005	Kitt Peak	Spacewatch	·	1.7 km	MPC · JPL
268431	2005 VS_{6}	—	November 6, 2005	Kitt Peak	Spacewatch	·	1.9 km	MPC · JPL
268432	2005 VN_{25}	—	November 2, 2005	Socorro	LINEAR	·	1.7 km	MPC · JPL
268433	2005 VP_{42}	—	November 3, 2005	Mount Lemmon	Mount Lemmon Survey	·	2.1 km	MPC · JPL
268434	2005 VG_{43}	—	November 5, 2005	Catalina	CSS	·	1.7 km	MPC · JPL
268435	2005 VO_{43}	—	November 1, 2005	Socorro	LINEAR	·	2.3 km	MPC · JPL
268436	2005 VE_{53}	—	November 3, 2005	Mount Lemmon	Mount Lemmon Survey	·	1.6 km	MPC · JPL
268437	2005 VO_{82}	—	November 3, 2005	Kitt Peak	Spacewatch	·	1.4 km	MPC · JPL
268438	2005 VJ_{89}	—	November 6, 2005	Kitt Peak	Spacewatch	·	1.4 km	MPC · JPL
268439	2005 VH_{113}	—	November 10, 2005	Catalina	CSS	·	1.5 km	MPC · JPL
268440	2005 VH_{124}	—	November 6, 2005	Mount Lemmon	Mount Lemmon Survey	·	1.2 km	MPC · JPL
268441	2005 VH_{128}	—	November 1, 2005	Apache Point	A. C. Becker	(5)	1.4 km	MPC · JPL
268442	2005 WK_{23}	—	November 21, 2005	Kitt Peak	Spacewatch	(5)	1.4 km	MPC · JPL
268443	2005 WY_{26}	—	November 21, 2005	Kitt Peak	Spacewatch	·	1.9 km	MPC · JPL
268444	2005 WV_{28}	—	November 21, 2005	Kitt Peak	Spacewatch	·	1.4 km	MPC · JPL
268445	2005 WU_{36}	—	November 22, 2005	Kitt Peak	Spacewatch	·	1.9 km	MPC · JPL
268446	2005 WA_{45}	—	November 22, 2005	Kitt Peak	Spacewatch	·	1.6 km	MPC · JPL
268447	2005 WB_{46}	—	November 22, 2005	Kitt Peak	Spacewatch	·	1.6 km	MPC · JPL
268448	2005 WB_{51}	—	November 25, 2005	Kitt Peak	Spacewatch	·	1.8 km	MPC · JPL
268449	2005 WP_{51}	—	November 25, 2005	Kitt Peak	Spacewatch	MIS	2.3 km	MPC · JPL
268450	2005 WU_{51}	—	November 25, 2005	Kitt Peak	Spacewatch	·	2.2 km	MPC · JPL
268451	2005 WU_{53}	—	November 25, 2005	Mount Lemmon	Mount Lemmon Survey	RAF	1.1 km	MPC · JPL
268452	2005 WR_{69}	—	November 26, 2005	Kitt Peak	Spacewatch	·	1.5 km	MPC · JPL
268453	2005 WA_{72}	—	November 22, 2005	Catalina	CSS	·	2.0 km	MPC · JPL
268454	2005 WT_{72}	—	November 25, 2005	Kitt Peak	Spacewatch	·	2.5 km	MPC · JPL
268455	2005 WE_{85}	—	November 28, 2005	Mount Lemmon	Mount Lemmon Survey	T_{j} (2.99) · HIL · 3:2	6.3 km	MPC · JPL
268456	2005 WR_{93}	—	November 25, 2005	Catalina	CSS	·	2.8 km	MPC · JPL
268457	2005 WT_{93}	—	November 25, 2005	Palomar	NEAT	EUP	6.3 km	MPC · JPL
268458	2005 WT_{111}	—	November 30, 2005	Socorro	LINEAR	·	2.3 km	MPC · JPL
268459	2005 WN_{117}	—	November 28, 2005	Socorro	LINEAR	·	2.6 km	MPC · JPL
268460	2005 WY_{120}	—	November 30, 2005	Socorro	LINEAR	NYS	1.3 km	MPC · JPL
268461	2005 WD_{156}	—	November 29, 2005	Palomar	NEAT	·	2.2 km	MPC · JPL
268462	2005 WW_{165}	—	November 29, 2005	Mount Lemmon	Mount Lemmon Survey	·	1.5 km	MPC · JPL
268463	2005 WS_{177}	—	November 30, 2005	Kitt Peak	Spacewatch	·	1.7 km	MPC · JPL
268464	2005 WX_{180}	—	November 22, 2005	Catalina	CSS	·	2.9 km	MPC · JPL
268465	2005 WG_{184}	—	November 28, 2005	Catalina	CSS	·	2.7 km	MPC · JPL
268466	2005 WG_{190}	—	November 20, 2005	Catalina	CSS	·	2.4 km	MPC · JPL
268467	2005 WV_{195}	—	November 25, 2005	Mount Lemmon	Mount Lemmon Survey	AGN	1.6 km	MPC · JPL
268468	2005 WH_{205}	—	November 26, 2005	Mount Lemmon	Mount Lemmon Survey	·	2.3 km	MPC · JPL
268469	2005 WU_{207}	—	November 25, 2005	Mount Lemmon	Mount Lemmon Survey	·	3.0 km	MPC · JPL
268470	2005 XJ_{6}	—	December 2, 2005	Kitt Peak	Spacewatch	·	1.9 km	MPC · JPL
268471	2005 XC_{22}	—	December 2, 2005	Socorro	LINEAR	(5)	2.0 km	MPC · JPL
268472	2005 XK_{31}	—	December 1, 2005	Kitt Peak	Spacewatch	·	1.6 km	MPC · JPL
268473	2005 XK_{51}	—	December 2, 2005	Kitt Peak	Spacewatch	NEM	2.5 km	MPC · JPL
268474	2005 XC_{52}	—	December 2, 2005	Kitt Peak	Spacewatch	·	2.4 km	MPC · JPL
268475	2005 XN_{52}	—	December 2, 2005	Kitt Peak	Spacewatch	·	1.9 km	MPC · JPL
268476	2005 XV_{52}	—	December 2, 2005	Kitt Peak	Spacewatch	·	1.8 km	MPC · JPL
268477	2005 XM_{59}	—	December 3, 2005	Kitt Peak	Spacewatch	·	1.8 km	MPC · JPL
268478	2005 XV_{59}	—	December 3, 2005	Kitt Peak	Spacewatch	·	2.2 km	MPC · JPL
268479	2005 XJ_{61}	—	December 4, 2005	Kitt Peak	Spacewatch	·	1.8 km	MPC · JPL
268480	2005 XN_{63}	—	December 5, 2005	Mount Lemmon	Mount Lemmon Survey	·	1.9 km	MPC · JPL
268481	2005 XW_{65}	—	December 7, 2005	Socorro	LINEAR	·	1.9 km	MPC · JPL
268482	2005 XH_{69}	—	December 6, 2005	Kitt Peak	Spacewatch	RAF	1.3 km	MPC · JPL
268483	2005 XS_{72}	—	December 6, 2005	Kitt Peak	Spacewatch	·	1.6 km	MPC · JPL
268484	2005 XZ_{73}	—	December 6, 2005	Kitt Peak	Spacewatch	·	5.6 km	MPC · JPL
268485	2005 XM_{76}	—	December 7, 2005	Kitt Peak	Spacewatch	GEF	1.6 km	MPC · JPL
268486	2005 XX_{82}	—	December 1, 2005	Anderson Mesa	LONEOS	·	1.9 km	MPC · JPL
268487	2005 XJ_{84}	—	December 8, 2005	Socorro	LINEAR	·	1.9 km	MPC · JPL
268488	2005 YO	—	December 20, 2005	Calvin-Rehoboth	Calvin College	·	2.2 km	MPC · JPL
268489	2005 YF_{3}	—	December 22, 2005	Socorro	LINEAR	·	2.2 km	MPC · JPL
268490	2005 YW_{10}	—	December 21, 2005	Kitt Peak	Spacewatch	·	1.6 km	MPC · JPL
268491	2005 YC_{16}	—	December 22, 2005	Kitt Peak	Spacewatch	·	2.2 km	MPC · JPL
268492	2005 YE_{25}	—	December 24, 2005	Kitt Peak	Spacewatch	·	1.6 km	MPC · JPL
268493	2005 YF_{29}	—	December 24, 2005	Kitt Peak	Spacewatch	·	1.8 km	MPC · JPL
268494	2005 YG_{43}	—	December 24, 2005	Kitt Peak	Spacewatch	·	2.0 km	MPC · JPL
268495	2005 YO_{44}	—	December 25, 2005	Kitt Peak	Spacewatch	·	2.6 km	MPC · JPL
268496	2005 YR_{48}	—	December 22, 2005	Kitt Peak	Spacewatch	·	2.2 km	MPC · JPL
268497	2005 YY_{56}	—	December 24, 2005	Kitt Peak	Spacewatch	·	2.2 km	MPC · JPL
268498	2005 YC_{72}	—	December 24, 2005	Kitt Peak	Spacewatch	·	1.9 km	MPC · JPL
268499	2005 YA_{83}	—	December 24, 2005	Kitt Peak	Spacewatch	·	2.3 km	MPC · JPL
268500	2005 YF_{86}	—	December 25, 2005	Mount Lemmon	Mount Lemmon Survey	·	2.8 km	MPC · JPL

== 268501–268600 ==
back to top

Designation			Discovery			Properties		Ref
Permanent	Provisional	Named after	Date	Site	Discoverer(s)	Category	Diam.	Ref
268501	2005 YY_{105}	—	December 25, 2005	Kitt Peak	Spacewatch	AGN	1.4 km	MPC · JPL
268502	2005 YU_{110}	—	December 25, 2005	Kitt Peak	Spacewatch	AGN	1.2 km	MPC · JPL
268503	2005 YA_{113}	—	December 25, 2005	Mount Lemmon	Mount Lemmon Survey	KOR	2.0 km	MPC · JPL
268504	2005 YM_{115}	—	December 25, 2005	Kitt Peak	Spacewatch	AGN	1.4 km	MPC · JPL
268505	2005 YY_{119}	—	December 27, 2005	Mount Lemmon	Mount Lemmon Survey	·	1.8 km	MPC · JPL
268506	2005 YW_{129}	—	December 24, 2005	Kitt Peak	Spacewatch	·	2.5 km	MPC · JPL
268507	2005 YG_{132}	—	December 25, 2005	Mount Lemmon	Mount Lemmon Survey	KOR	1.5 km	MPC · JPL
268508	2005 YE_{135}	—	December 26, 2005	Kitt Peak	Spacewatch	·	2.1 km	MPC · JPL
268509	2005 YP_{149}	—	December 25, 2005	Kitt Peak	Spacewatch	·	2.7 km	MPC · JPL
268510	2005 YK_{150}	—	December 25, 2005	Kitt Peak	Spacewatch	·	2.2 km	MPC · JPL
268511	2005 YK_{153}	—	December 29, 2005	Mount Lemmon	Mount Lemmon Survey	·	1.9 km	MPC · JPL
268512	2005 YJ_{156}	—	December 26, 2005	Mount Lemmon	Mount Lemmon Survey	·	3.1 km	MPC · JPL
268513	2005 YB_{159}	—	December 27, 2005	Kitt Peak	Spacewatch	·	2.4 km	MPC · JPL
268514	2005 YV_{161}	—	December 27, 2005	Kitt Peak	Spacewatch	·	1.9 km	MPC · JPL
268515	2005 YD_{178}	—	December 22, 2005	Kitt Peak	Spacewatch	·	1.7 km	MPC · JPL
268516	2005 YR_{189}	—	December 29, 2005	Kitt Peak	Spacewatch	·	1.8 km	MPC · JPL
268517	2005 YR_{191}	—	December 30, 2005	Kitt Peak	Spacewatch	AGN	1.2 km	MPC · JPL
268518	2005 YW_{196}	—	December 24, 2005	Kitt Peak	Spacewatch	·	1.6 km	MPC · JPL
268519	2005 YR_{199}	—	December 25, 2005	Mount Lemmon	Mount Lemmon Survey	·	2.5 km	MPC · JPL
268520	2005 YR_{203}	—	December 25, 2005	Mount Lemmon	Mount Lemmon Survey	·	2.2 km	MPC · JPL
268521	2005 YE_{209}	—	December 22, 2005	Catalina	CSS	BRA	2.2 km	MPC · JPL
268522	2005 YW_{211}	—	December 28, 2005	Catalina	CSS	·	2.1 km	MPC · JPL
268523	2005 YF_{212}	—	December 28, 2005	Catalina	CSS	DOR	2.8 km	MPC · JPL
268524	2005 YO_{220}	—	December 29, 2005	Socorro	LINEAR	·	2.9 km	MPC · JPL
268525	2005 YX_{221}	—	December 21, 2005	Kitt Peak	Spacewatch	NEM	3.1 km	MPC · JPL
268526	2005 YZ_{227}	—	December 25, 2005	Mount Lemmon	Mount Lemmon Survey	NEM	3.0 km	MPC · JPL
268527	2005 YU_{249}	—	December 28, 2005	Kitt Peak	Spacewatch	AGN	1.5 km	MPC · JPL
268528	2005 YN_{254}	—	December 30, 2005	Kitt Peak	Spacewatch	·	2.0 km	MPC · JPL
268529	2005 YY_{257}	—	December 21, 2005	Kitt Peak	Spacewatch	·	1.7 km	MPC · JPL
268530	2005 YN_{264}	—	December 25, 2005	Kitt Peak	Spacewatch	DOR	4.0 km	MPC · JPL
268531	2005 YX_{274}	—	December 25, 2005	Anderson Mesa	LONEOS	DOR	3.2 km	MPC · JPL
268532	2005 YN_{282}	—	December 26, 2005	Mount Lemmon	Mount Lemmon Survey	·	2.0 km	MPC · JPL
268533	2006 AT_{19}	—	January 5, 2006	Catalina	CSS	·	2.7 km	MPC · JPL
268534	2006 AB_{28}	—	January 5, 2006	Mount Lemmon	Mount Lemmon Survey	·	3.3 km	MPC · JPL
268535	2006 AR_{31}	—	January 5, 2006	Catalina	CSS	·	2.6 km	MPC · JPL
268536	2006 AW_{31}	—	January 5, 2006	Catalina	CSS	·	3.6 km	MPC · JPL
268537	2006 AH_{33}	—	January 6, 2006	Socorro	LINEAR	·	2.4 km	MPC · JPL
268538	2006 AP_{36}	—	January 4, 2006	Kitt Peak	Spacewatch	·	1.9 km	MPC · JPL
268539	2006 AL_{41}	—	January 4, 2006	Kitt Peak	Spacewatch	HOF	2.8 km	MPC · JPL
268540	2006 AE_{44}	—	January 7, 2006	Mount Lemmon	Mount Lemmon Survey	·	2.9 km	MPC · JPL
268541	2006 AU_{47}	—	January 7, 2006	Kitt Peak	Spacewatch	AGN	1.1 km	MPC · JPL
268542	2006 AU_{48}	—	January 4, 2006	Kitt Peak	Spacewatch	·	1.6 km	MPC · JPL
268543	2006 AT_{53}	—	January 5, 2006	Kitt Peak	Spacewatch	KOR	1.5 km	MPC · JPL
268544	2006 AN_{60}	—	January 5, 2006	Kitt Peak	Spacewatch	(12739)	1.6 km	MPC · JPL
268545	2006 AP_{60}	—	January 5, 2006	Kitt Peak	Spacewatch	·	1.6 km	MPC · JPL
268546	2006 AD_{73}	—	January 7, 2006	Mount Lemmon	Mount Lemmon Survey	·	2.6 km	MPC · JPL
268547	2006 AD_{82}	—	January 8, 2006	Mount Lemmon	Mount Lemmon Survey	·	2.8 km	MPC · JPL
268548	2006 AT_{82}	—	January 7, 2006	Socorro	LINEAR	·	3.5 km	MPC · JPL
268549	2006 AU_{88}	—	January 5, 2006	Mount Lemmon	Mount Lemmon Survey	·	3.0 km	MPC · JPL
268550	2006 AV_{89}	—	January 5, 2006	Kitt Peak	Spacewatch	·	2.4 km	MPC · JPL
268551	2006 AD_{105}	—	January 8, 2006	Mount Lemmon	Mount Lemmon Survey	·	2.1 km	MPC · JPL
268552	2006 BG_{8}	—	January 22, 2006	Junk Bond	D. Healy	·	2.7 km	MPC · JPL
268553	2006 BN_{21}	—	January 22, 2006	Mount Lemmon	Mount Lemmon Survey	·	2.7 km	MPC · JPL
268554	2006 BQ_{28}	—	January 22, 2006	Mount Lemmon	Mount Lemmon Survey	·	3.9 km	MPC · JPL
268555	2006 BF_{31}	—	January 20, 2006	Kitt Peak	Spacewatch	·	2.6 km	MPC · JPL
268556	2006 BQ_{31}	—	January 20, 2006	Kitt Peak	Spacewatch	(13314)	3.6 km	MPC · JPL
268557	2006 BH_{32}	—	January 20, 2006	Kitt Peak	Spacewatch	·	3.8 km	MPC · JPL
268558	2006 BR_{33}	—	January 21, 2006	Kitt Peak	Spacewatch	·	3.5 km	MPC · JPL
268559	2006 BH_{34}	—	January 21, 2006	Kitt Peak	Spacewatch	·	2.6 km	MPC · JPL
268560	2006 BB_{38}	—	January 23, 2006	Kitt Peak	Spacewatch	·	2.1 km	MPC · JPL
268561	2006 BX_{38}	—	January 24, 2006	Mount Lemmon	Mount Lemmon Survey	·	2.0 km	MPC · JPL
268562	2006 BA_{40}	—	January 20, 2006	Kitt Peak	Spacewatch	KOR	1.8 km	MPC · JPL
268563	2006 BK_{46}	—	January 23, 2006	Mount Lemmon	Mount Lemmon Survey	·	2.6 km	MPC · JPL
268564	2006 BY_{47}	—	January 25, 2006	Kitt Peak	Spacewatch	·	1.7 km	MPC · JPL
268565	2006 BS_{52}	—	January 25, 2006	Kitt Peak	Spacewatch	AGN	1.7 km	MPC · JPL
268566	2006 BT_{59}	—	January 25, 2006	Kitt Peak	Spacewatch	·	3.0 km	MPC · JPL
268567	2006 BX_{64}	—	January 22, 2006	Mount Lemmon	Mount Lemmon Survey	MRX	1.6 km	MPC · JPL
268568	2006 BF_{66}	—	January 23, 2006	Kitt Peak	Spacewatch	KOR	1.7 km	MPC · JPL
268569	2006 BN_{88}	—	January 25, 2006	Kitt Peak	Spacewatch	·	2.6 km	MPC · JPL
268570	2006 BZ_{88}	—	January 25, 2006	Kitt Peak	Spacewatch	·	2.3 km	MPC · JPL
268571	2006 BW_{90}	—	January 26, 2006	Socorro	LINEAR	·	4.0 km	MPC · JPL
268572	2006 BV_{92}	—	January 26, 2006	Kitt Peak	Spacewatch	KOR	1.7 km	MPC · JPL
268573	2006 BY_{97}	—	January 27, 2006	Catalina	CSS	·	2.6 km	MPC · JPL
268574	2006 BO_{99}	—	January 20, 2006	Kitt Peak	Spacewatch	AGN	1.6 km	MPC · JPL
268575	2006 BP_{102}	—	January 23, 2006	Mount Lemmon	Mount Lemmon Survey	·	2.8 km	MPC · JPL
268576	2006 BU_{102}	—	January 23, 2006	Mount Lemmon	Mount Lemmon Survey	KOR	1.4 km	MPC · JPL
268577	2006 BY_{102}	—	January 23, 2006	Mount Lemmon	Mount Lemmon Survey	·	3.4 km	MPC · JPL
268578	2006 BO_{116}	—	January 26, 2006	Kitt Peak	Spacewatch	HOF	3.9 km	MPC · JPL
268579	2006 BY_{121}	—	January 26, 2006	Kitt Peak	Spacewatch	·	3.1 km	MPC · JPL
268580	2006 BT_{125}	—	January 26, 2006	Kitt Peak	Spacewatch	·	1.6 km	MPC · JPL
268581	2006 BB_{126}	—	January 26, 2006	Kitt Peak	Spacewatch	KOR	1.5 km	MPC · JPL
268582	2006 BD_{126}	—	January 26, 2006	Kitt Peak	Spacewatch	HOF	4.7 km	MPC · JPL
268583	2006 BU_{132}	—	January 26, 2006	Kitt Peak	Spacewatch	KOR	1.9 km	MPC · JPL
268584	2006 BG_{144}	—	January 23, 2006	Catalina	CSS	·	4.7 km	MPC · JPL
268585	2006 BR_{145}	—	January 23, 2006	Catalina	CSS	H	870 m	MPC · JPL
268586	2006 BL_{149}	—	January 23, 2006	Catalina	CSS	·	3.3 km	MPC · JPL
268587	2006 BM_{161}	—	January 26, 2006	Kitt Peak	Spacewatch	·	2.5 km	MPC · JPL
268588	2006 BS_{169}	—	January 26, 2006	Mount Lemmon	Mount Lemmon Survey	·	3.7 km	MPC · JPL
268589	2006 BC_{180}	—	January 27, 2006	Mount Lemmon	Mount Lemmon Survey	·	3.5 km	MPC · JPL
268590	2006 BB_{191}	—	January 28, 2006	Mount Lemmon	Mount Lemmon Survey	·	2.5 km	MPC · JPL
268591	2006 BM_{199}	—	January 30, 2006	Kitt Peak	Spacewatch	·	2.2 km	MPC · JPL
268592	2006 BP_{200}	—	January 31, 2006	Kitt Peak	Spacewatch	HOF	3.3 km	MPC · JPL
268593	2006 BO_{206}	—	January 31, 2006	Mount Lemmon	Mount Lemmon Survey	·	2.5 km	MPC · JPL
268594	2006 BJ_{210}	—	January 31, 2006	Catalina	CSS	·	3.1 km	MPC · JPL
268595	2006 BH_{221}	—	January 30, 2006	Kitt Peak	Spacewatch	KOR	1.8 km	MPC · JPL
268596	2006 BG_{223}	—	January 30, 2006	Kitt Peak	Spacewatch	·	2.6 km	MPC · JPL
268597	2006 BK_{242}	—	January 31, 2006	Kitt Peak	Spacewatch	GEF	2.1 km	MPC · JPL
268598	2006 BQ_{242}	—	January 31, 2006	Kitt Peak	Spacewatch	·	4.5 km	MPC · JPL
268599	2006 BB_{245}	—	January 31, 2006	Kitt Peak	Spacewatch	KOR	1.8 km	MPC · JPL
268600	2006 BB_{247}	—	January 31, 2006	Kitt Peak	Spacewatch	·	2.4 km	MPC · JPL

== 268601–268700 ==
back to top

Designation			Discovery			Properties		Ref
Permanent	Provisional	Named after	Date	Site	Discoverer(s)	Category	Diam.	Ref
268601	2006 BN_{247}	—	January 31, 2006	Kitt Peak	Spacewatch	·	4.4 km	MPC · JPL
268602	2006 BA_{251}	—	January 31, 2006	Mount Lemmon	Mount Lemmon Survey	·	2.0 km	MPC · JPL
268603	2006 BJ_{253}	—	January 31, 2006	Kitt Peak	Spacewatch	KOR	1.5 km	MPC · JPL
268604	2006 BO_{254}	—	January 31, 2006	Kitt Peak	Spacewatch	EOS	2.4 km	MPC · JPL
268605	2006 BA_{256}	—	January 31, 2006	Kitt Peak	Spacewatch	·	3.2 km	MPC · JPL
268606	2006 BK_{256}	—	January 31, 2006	Kitt Peak	Spacewatch	KOR	1.8 km	MPC · JPL
268607	2006 BJ_{260}	—	January 31, 2006	Kitt Peak	Spacewatch	MRX	1.6 km	MPC · JPL
268608	2006 BT_{265}	—	January 31, 2006	Kitt Peak	Spacewatch	KOR	2.0 km	MPC · JPL
268609	2006 BS_{266}	—	January 25, 2006	Anderson Mesa	LONEOS	·	3.9 km	MPC · JPL
268610	2006 BR_{283}	—	January 22, 2006	Mount Lemmon	Mount Lemmon Survey	·	3.9 km	MPC · JPL
268611	2006 CY_{30}	—	February 2, 2006	Kitt Peak	Spacewatch	WIT · fast	1.5 km	MPC · JPL
268612	2006 CK_{42}	—	February 2, 2006	Kitt Peak	Spacewatch	·	2.7 km	MPC · JPL
268613	2006 CZ_{43}	—	February 2, 2006	Kitt Peak	Spacewatch	·	4.0 km	MPC · JPL
268614	2006 CT_{46}	—	February 3, 2006	Kitt Peak	Spacewatch	·	2.3 km	MPC · JPL
268615	2006 CG_{51}	—	February 4, 2006	Kitt Peak	Spacewatch	·	2.0 km	MPC · JPL
268616	2006 CK_{65}	—	February 2, 2006	Kitt Peak	Spacewatch	GEF	2.0 km	MPC · JPL
268617	2006 CE_{67}	—	February 4, 2006	Mount Lemmon	Mount Lemmon Survey	·	2.2 km	MPC · JPL
268618	2006 CF_{67}	—	February 7, 2006	Mount Lemmon	Mount Lemmon Survey	·	3.5 km	MPC · JPL
268619	2006 CW_{67}	—	February 7, 2006	Mount Lemmon	Mount Lemmon Survey	·	2.5 km	MPC · JPL
268620	2006 DZ_{3}	—	February 20, 2006	Catalina	CSS	EOS	2.5 km	MPC · JPL
268621	2006 DA_{6}	—	February 20, 2006	Catalina	CSS	KOR	2.3 km	MPC · JPL
268622	2006 DX_{20}	—	February 20, 2006	Catalina	CSS	·	2.6 km	MPC · JPL
268623	2006 DT_{22}	—	February 20, 2006	Kitt Peak	Spacewatch	KOR	2.3 km	MPC · JPL
268624	2006 DF_{23}	—	February 20, 2006	Kitt Peak	Spacewatch	·	3.5 km	MPC · JPL
268625	2006 DD_{24}	—	February 20, 2006	Kitt Peak	Spacewatch	·	5.0 km	MPC · JPL
268626	2006 DS_{28}	—	February 20, 2006	Kitt Peak	Spacewatch	THM	3.0 km	MPC · JPL
268627	2006 DR_{29}	—	February 20, 2006	Kitt Peak	Spacewatch	·	4.5 km	MPC · JPL
268628	2006 DE_{30}	—	February 20, 2006	Kitt Peak	Spacewatch	KOR	2.1 km	MPC · JPL
268629	2006 DK_{30}	—	February 20, 2006	Kitt Peak	Spacewatch	·	2.1 km	MPC · JPL
268630	2006 DC_{36}	—	February 20, 2006	Kitt Peak	Spacewatch	·	2.0 km	MPC · JPL
268631	2006 DK_{46}	—	February 20, 2006	Mount Lemmon	Mount Lemmon Survey	KOR	1.3 km	MPC · JPL
268632	2006 DG_{58}	—	February 24, 2006	Mount Lemmon	Mount Lemmon Survey	EOS	2.5 km	MPC · JPL
268633	2006 DG_{69}	—	February 20, 2006	Kitt Peak	Spacewatch	EOS	2.2 km	MPC · JPL
268634	2006 DU_{88}	—	February 24, 2006	Kitt Peak	Spacewatch	·	2.7 km	MPC · JPL
268635	2006 DG_{96}	—	February 24, 2006	Kitt Peak	Spacewatch	·	2.6 km	MPC · JPL
268636	2006 DS_{101}	—	February 25, 2006	Kitt Peak	Spacewatch	KOR	1.8 km	MPC · JPL
268637	2006 DL_{106}	—	February 25, 2006	Mount Lemmon	Mount Lemmon Survey	·	3.7 km	MPC · JPL
268638	2006 DW_{109}	—	February 25, 2006	Mount Lemmon	Mount Lemmon Survey	·	5.1 km	MPC · JPL
268639	2006 DE_{114}	—	February 27, 2006	Socorro	LINEAR	H	630 m	MPC · JPL
268640	2006 DP_{115}	—	February 27, 2006	Kitt Peak	Spacewatch	AEG	3.6 km	MPC · JPL
268641	2006 DR_{116}	—	February 27, 2006	Catalina	CSS	(18466)	4.3 km	MPC · JPL
268642	2006 DV_{119}	—	February 20, 2006	Socorro	LINEAR	·	4.5 km	MPC · JPL
268643	2006 DR_{126}	—	February 25, 2006	Kitt Peak	Spacewatch	EOS	1.9 km	MPC · JPL
268644	2006 DA_{132}	—	February 25, 2006	Kitt Peak	Spacewatch	·	3.0 km	MPC · JPL
268645	2006 DS_{133}	—	February 25, 2006	Kitt Peak	Spacewatch	·	3.7 km	MPC · JPL
268646	2006 DD_{141}	—	February 25, 2006	Kitt Peak	Spacewatch	·	2.4 km	MPC · JPL
268647	2006 DS_{146}	—	February 25, 2006	Kitt Peak	Spacewatch	·	2.7 km	MPC · JPL
268648	2006 DK_{156}	—	February 27, 2006	Kitt Peak	Spacewatch	KOR	1.5 km	MPC · JPL
268649	2006 DN_{175}	—	February 27, 2006	Mount Lemmon	Mount Lemmon Survey	EOS	3.9 km	MPC · JPL
268650	2006 DC_{189}	—	February 27, 2006	Kitt Peak	Spacewatch	·	2.8 km	MPC · JPL
268651	2006 DG_{192}	—	February 27, 2006	Kitt Peak	Spacewatch	EOS	2.5 km	MPC · JPL
268652	2006 DT_{203}	—	February 22, 2006	Catalina	CSS	·	6.3 km	MPC · JPL
268653	2006 DT_{212}	—	February 23, 2006	Mount Lemmon	Mount Lemmon Survey	HOF	3.3 km	MPC · JPL
268654	2006 DA_{215}	—	February 25, 2006	Kitt Peak	Spacewatch	EOS	2.6 km	MPC · JPL
268655	2006 DW_{215}	—	February 25, 2006	Mount Lemmon	Mount Lemmon Survey	EOS	3.0 km	MPC · JPL
268656	2006 DS_{216}	—	February 20, 2006	Kitt Peak	Spacewatch	·	4.2 km	MPC · JPL
268657	2006 EB_{2}	—	October 18, 2003	Anderson Mesa	LONEOS	·	3.6 km	MPC · JPL
268658	2006 EG_{6}	—	March 2, 2006	Kitt Peak	Spacewatch	·	2.1 km	MPC · JPL
268659	2006 EL_{19}	—	March 2, 2006	Kitt Peak	Spacewatch	·	5.7 km	MPC · JPL
268660	2006 EX_{20}	—	March 3, 2006	Kitt Peak	Spacewatch	·	3.7 km	MPC · JPL
268661	2006 ES_{22}	—	March 3, 2006	Kitt Peak	Spacewatch	KOR	1.6 km	MPC · JPL
268662	2006 EW_{29}	—	March 3, 2006	Kitt Peak	Spacewatch	EOS	2.6 km	MPC · JPL
268663	2006 EE_{36}	—	March 3, 2006	Mount Lemmon	Mount Lemmon Survey	·	4.0 km	MPC · JPL
268664	2006 ED_{43}	—	March 4, 2006	Catalina	CSS	·	6.3 km	MPC · JPL
268665	2006 EC_{58}	—	March 5, 2006	Kitt Peak	Spacewatch	·	4.0 km	MPC · JPL
268666	2006 EC_{60}	—	March 5, 2006	Kitt Peak	Spacewatch	·	2.8 km	MPC · JPL
268667	2006 EQ_{65}	—	March 5, 2006	Kitt Peak	Spacewatch	EOS	2.7 km	MPC · JPL
268668	2006 EZ_{71}	—	March 4, 2006	Kitt Peak	Spacewatch	·	2.5 km	MPC · JPL
268669 Bunun	2006 FA	Bunun	March 18, 2006	Lulin	Yang, T.-C., Q. Ye	·	2.5 km	MPC · JPL
268670	2006 FS_{7}	—	March 23, 2006	Kitt Peak	Spacewatch	THM	2.8 km	MPC · JPL
268671	2006 FP_{10}	—	March 21, 2006	Mount Lemmon	Mount Lemmon Survey	·	4.4 km	MPC · JPL
268672	2006 FT_{14}	—	March 23, 2006	Kitt Peak	Spacewatch	EMA	4.3 km	MPC · JPL
268673	2006 FF_{15}	—	March 23, 2006	Catalina	CSS	·	3.4 km	MPC · JPL
268674	2006 FJ_{17}	—	March 23, 2006	Mount Lemmon	Mount Lemmon Survey	·	3.7 km	MPC · JPL
268675	2006 FM_{17}	—	March 23, 2006	Mount Lemmon	Mount Lemmon Survey	·	5.3 km	MPC · JPL
268676	2006 FM_{31}	—	March 25, 2006	Mount Lemmon	Mount Lemmon Survey	·	2.3 km	MPC · JPL
268677	2006 FO_{37}	—	March 24, 2006	Siding Spring	SSS	·	5.3 km	MPC · JPL
268678	2006 FJ_{38}	—	March 23, 2006	Kitt Peak	Spacewatch	·	3.2 km	MPC · JPL
268679	2006 FQ_{43}	—	March 23, 2006	Catalina	CSS	NAE	4.7 km	MPC · JPL
268680	2006 FM_{44}	—	March 23, 2006	Mount Lemmon	Mount Lemmon Survey	·	5.0 km	MPC · JPL
268681	2006 FF_{48}	—	March 24, 2006	Anderson Mesa	LONEOS	EOS	2.3 km	MPC · JPL
268682	2006 FO_{50}	—	March 25, 2006	Catalina	CSS	·	6.1 km	MPC · JPL
268683	2006 FF_{52}	—	March 26, 2006	Siding Spring	SSS	·	6.0 km	MPC · JPL
268684	2006 FJ_{53}	—	March 25, 2006	Kitt Peak	Spacewatch	HYG	3.2 km	MPC · JPL
268685	2006 FR_{54}	—	March 26, 2006	Mount Lemmon	Mount Lemmon Survey	·	3.3 km	MPC · JPL
268686 Elenaaprile	2006 GW	Elenaaprile	April 2, 2006	Vallemare Borbona	V. S. Casulli	EOS	2.4 km	MPC · JPL
268687	2006 GL_{21}	—	April 2, 2006	Mount Lemmon	Mount Lemmon Survey	·	3.2 km	MPC · JPL
268688	2006 GO_{23}	—	April 2, 2006	Kitt Peak	Spacewatch	·	4.4 km	MPC · JPL
268689	2006 GO_{26}	—	April 2, 2006	Kitt Peak	Spacewatch	·	3.5 km	MPC · JPL
268690	2006 GF_{27}	—	April 2, 2006	Kitt Peak	Spacewatch	THM	2.8 km	MPC · JPL
268691	2006 GK_{31}	—	April 2, 2006	Kitt Peak	Spacewatch	HYG	4.0 km	MPC · JPL
268692	2006 GZ_{40}	—	April 7, 2006	Catalina	CSS	·	6.8 km	MPC · JPL
268693	2006 GN_{42}	—	April 6, 2006	Catalina	CSS	·	5.6 km	MPC · JPL
268694	2006 GK_{46}	—	April 8, 2006	Kitt Peak	Spacewatch	·	4.7 km	MPC · JPL
268695	2006 GO_{48}	—	April 9, 2006	Kitt Peak	Spacewatch	THM	2.6 km	MPC · JPL
268696	2006 GS_{50}	—	April 1, 2006	Siding Spring	SSS	·	4.6 km	MPC · JPL
268697	2006 GP_{51}	—	April 7, 2006	Catalina	CSS	·	4.1 km	MPC · JPL
268698	2006 GA_{52}	—	April 7, 2006	Siding Spring	SSS	·	4.7 km	MPC · JPL
268699	2006 HW_{4}	—	April 19, 2006	Mount Lemmon	Mount Lemmon Survey	KOR	1.9 km	MPC · JPL
268700	2006 HP_{6}	—	April 18, 2006	Anderson Mesa	LONEOS	·	4.3 km	MPC · JPL

== 268701–268800 ==
back to top

Designation			Discovery			Properties		Ref
Permanent	Provisional	Named after	Date	Site	Discoverer(s)	Category	Diam.	Ref
268701	2006 HG_{12}	—	April 19, 2006	Kitt Peak	Spacewatch	·	4.0 km	MPC · JPL
268702	2006 HJ_{16}	—	April 20, 2006	Kitt Peak	Spacewatch	·	3.1 km	MPC · JPL
268703	2006 HV_{17}	—	April 20, 2006	Anderson Mesa	LONEOS	·	2.5 km	MPC · JPL
268704	2006 HZ_{19}	—	April 19, 2006	Mount Lemmon	Mount Lemmon Survey	·	4.7 km	MPC · JPL
268705	2006 HB_{21}	—	April 20, 2006	Kitt Peak	Spacewatch	·	3.9 km	MPC · JPL
268706	2006 HD_{23}	—	April 20, 2006	Kitt Peak	Spacewatch	EOS	2.8 km	MPC · JPL
268707	2006 HD_{28}	—	April 20, 2006	Kitt Peak	Spacewatch	·	6.0 km	MPC · JPL
268708	2006 HA_{32}	—	April 19, 2006	Kitt Peak	Spacewatch	·	3.3 km	MPC · JPL
268709	2006 HM_{33}	—	April 19, 2006	Mount Lemmon	Mount Lemmon Survey	·	4.2 km	MPC · JPL
268710	2006 HP_{40}	—	April 21, 2006	Mount Lemmon	Mount Lemmon Survey	·	2.4 km	MPC · JPL
268711	2006 HH_{44}	—	April 24, 2006	Mount Lemmon	Mount Lemmon Survey	·	4.0 km	MPC · JPL
268712	2006 HF_{46}	—	April 25, 2006	Catalina	CSS	VER	3.4 km	MPC · JPL
268713	2006 HK_{47}	—	April 24, 2006	Kitt Peak	Spacewatch	·	4.2 km	MPC · JPL
268714	2006 HN_{51}	—	April 24, 2006	Reedy Creek	J. Broughton	·	4.2 km	MPC · JPL
268715	2006 HT_{56}	—	April 19, 2006	Catalina	CSS	·	5.1 km	MPC · JPL
268716	2006 HL_{57}	—	April 18, 2006	Catalina	CSS	T_{j} (2.99) · EUP	6.3 km	MPC · JPL
268717	2006 HT_{60}	—	April 27, 2006	Catalina	CSS	·	3.4 km	MPC · JPL
268718	2006 HH_{61}	—	April 24, 2006	Kitt Peak	Spacewatch	·	4.0 km	MPC · JPL
268719	2006 HS_{70}	—	April 25, 2006	Kitt Peak	Spacewatch	·	2.8 km	MPC · JPL
268720	2006 HX_{71}	—	April 25, 2006	Kitt Peak	Spacewatch	·	2.7 km	MPC · JPL
268721	2006 HR_{75}	—	April 25, 2006	Kitt Peak	Spacewatch	LIX	4.2 km	MPC · JPL
268722	2006 HG_{85}	—	April 27, 2006	Kitt Peak	Spacewatch	·	2.9 km	MPC · JPL
268723	2006 HP_{105}	—	April 26, 2006	Anderson Mesa	LONEOS	·	5.3 km	MPC · JPL
268724	2006 HW_{114}	—	April 26, 2006	Kitt Peak	Spacewatch	·	3.2 km	MPC · JPL
268725	2006 HQ_{135}	—	April 26, 2006	Cerro Tololo	M. W. Buie	·	2.3 km	MPC · JPL
268726	2006 HV_{137}	—	April 26, 2006	Cerro Tololo	M. W. Buie	EOS	2.8 km	MPC · JPL
268727	2006 JK_{51}	—	May 2, 2006	Kitt Peak	Spacewatch	SYL · CYB	6.8 km	MPC · JPL
268728	2006 JX_{52}	—	May 6, 2006	Mount Lemmon	Mount Lemmon Survey	·	3.8 km	MPC · JPL
268729	2006 JF_{56}	—	May 2, 2006	Catalina	CSS	H	700 m	MPC · JPL
268730	2006 KU_{5}	—	May 19, 2006	Mount Lemmon	Mount Lemmon Survey	EOS	2.8 km	MPC · JPL
268731	2006 KQ_{6}	—	May 19, 2006	Mount Lemmon	Mount Lemmon Survey	THM	2.9 km	MPC · JPL
268732	2006 KZ_{14}	—	May 20, 2006	Palomar	NEAT	PHO	2.6 km	MPC · JPL
268733	2006 KJ_{17}	—	May 20, 2006	Palomar	NEAT	·	3.5 km	MPC · JPL
268734	2006 KR_{37}	—	May 23, 2006	Kitt Peak	Spacewatch	·	5.8 km	MPC · JPL
268735	2006 KY_{53}	—	May 21, 2006	Kitt Peak	Spacewatch	TIR	3.9 km	MPC · JPL
268736	2006 KC_{63}	—	May 23, 2006	Kitt Peak	Spacewatch	·	5.7 km	MPC · JPL
268737	2006 KB_{73}	—	May 23, 2006	Kitt Peak	Spacewatch	·	4.2 km	MPC · JPL
268738	2006 KQ_{101}	—	May 26, 2006	Kitt Peak	Spacewatch	H	760 m	MPC · JPL
268739	2006 KZ_{104}	—	May 28, 2006	Kitt Peak	Spacewatch	·	5.5 km	MPC · JPL
268740	2006 KF_{110}	—	May 31, 2006	Mount Lemmon	Mount Lemmon Survey	·	5.0 km	MPC · JPL
268741	2006 KF_{114}	—	May 24, 2006	Catalina	CSS	H	680 m	MPC · JPL
268742	2006 KT_{117}	—	May 31, 2006	Mount Lemmon	Mount Lemmon Survey	·	3.0 km	MPC · JPL
268743	2006 LU_{1}	—	June 5, 2006	Socorro	LINEAR	·	4.3 km	MPC · JPL
268744	2006 MA_{2}	—	June 16, 2006	Kitt Peak	Spacewatch	EOS	2.3 km	MPC · JPL
268745	2006 PN_{29}	—	August 12, 2006	Palomar	NEAT	H	650 m	MPC · JPL
268746	2006 QS_{24}	—	August 17, 2006	Palomar	NEAT	·	1.3 km	MPC · JPL
268747	2006 QK_{48}	—	August 21, 2006	Socorro	LINEAR	·	1.6 km	MPC · JPL
268748	2006 QB_{49}	—	August 21, 2006	Palomar	NEAT	H	870 m	MPC · JPL
268749	2006 QV_{64}	—	August 27, 2006	Kitt Peak	Spacewatch	·	940 m	MPC · JPL
268750	2006 QW_{65}	—	August 27, 2006	Kitt Peak	Spacewatch	·	1.0 km	MPC · JPL
268751	2006 QM_{77}	—	August 22, 2006	Palomar	NEAT	·	930 m	MPC · JPL
268752	2006 QX_{110}	—	August 30, 2006	La Sagra	OAM	PHO	3.0 km	MPC · JPL
268753	2006 QC_{137}	—	August 29, 2006	Anderson Mesa	LONEOS	·	1.0 km	MPC · JPL
268754	2006 QK_{137}	—	August 31, 2006	Marly	Observatoire Naef	·	850 m	MPC · JPL
268755	2006 QM_{142}	—	August 18, 2006	Palomar	NEAT	·	960 m	MPC · JPL
268756	2006 RV_{22}	—	September 15, 2006	Goodricke-Pigott	R. A. Tucker	·	1.1 km	MPC · JPL
268757	2006 RT_{52}	—	September 14, 2006	Kitt Peak	Spacewatch	·	820 m	MPC · JPL
268758	2006 RL_{82}	—	September 15, 2006	Kitt Peak	Spacewatch	·	810 m	MPC · JPL
268759	2006 RY_{90}	—	September 15, 2006	Kitt Peak	Spacewatch	·	580 m	MPC · JPL
268760	2006 RO_{93}	—	September 15, 2006	Kitt Peak	Spacewatch	·	710 m	MPC · JPL
268761	2006 SN_{5}	—	September 16, 2006	Palomar	NEAT	·	920 m	MPC · JPL
268762	2006 SS_{61}	—	September 17, 2006	Kitt Peak	Spacewatch	·	880 m	MPC · JPL
268763	2006 ST_{61}	—	September 17, 2006	Kitt Peak	Spacewatch	·	1.0 km	MPC · JPL
268764	2006 SU_{95}	—	September 18, 2006	Kitt Peak	Spacewatch	·	1.0 km	MPC · JPL
268765	2006 SU_{118}	—	September 24, 2006	Kitt Peak	Spacewatch	·	660 m	MPC · JPL
268766	2006 SS_{185}	—	September 25, 2006	Mount Lemmon	Mount Lemmon Survey	·	660 m	MPC · JPL
268767	2006 SQ_{263}	—	September 26, 2006	Kitt Peak	Spacewatch	·	840 m	MPC · JPL
268768	2006 SS_{279}	—	September 28, 2006	Catalina	CSS	·	810 m	MPC · JPL
268769	2006 SH_{313}	—	September 27, 2006	Kitt Peak	Spacewatch	·	880 m	MPC · JPL
268770	2006 SQ_{325}	—	September 27, 2006	Kitt Peak	Spacewatch	·	750 m	MPC · JPL
268771	2006 SR_{327}	—	September 27, 2006	Kitt Peak	Spacewatch	·	810 m	MPC · JPL
268772	2006 SO_{344}	—	September 28, 2006	Kitt Peak	Spacewatch	·	1.2 km	MPC · JPL
268773	2006 SL_{363}	—	September 30, 2006	Mount Lemmon	Mount Lemmon Survey	·	1.1 km	MPC · JPL
268774	2006 SS_{364}	—	September 28, 2006	Mount Lemmon	Mount Lemmon Survey	·	1.1 km	MPC · JPL
268775	2006 SY_{387}	—	September 30, 2006	Apache Point	A. C. Becker	·	940 m	MPC · JPL
268776	2006 TQ_{13}	—	October 10, 2006	Palomar	NEAT	·	820 m	MPC · JPL
268777	2006 TP_{16}	—	October 11, 2006	Kitt Peak	Spacewatch	·	840 m	MPC · JPL
268778	2006 TA_{18}	—	October 11, 2006	Kitt Peak	Spacewatch	·	950 m	MPC · JPL
268779	2006 TP_{27}	—	October 12, 2006	Kitt Peak	Spacewatch	·	970 m	MPC · JPL
268780	2006 TS_{27}	—	October 12, 2006	Kitt Peak	Spacewatch	·	800 m	MPC · JPL
268781	2006 TJ_{46}	—	October 12, 2006	Kitt Peak	Spacewatch	·	750 m	MPC · JPL
268782	2006 TB_{49}	—	October 12, 2006	Palomar	NEAT	·	870 m	MPC · JPL
268783	2006 TF_{58}	—	October 13, 2006	Kitt Peak	Spacewatch	·	780 m	MPC · JPL
268784	2006 TK_{68}	—	October 11, 2006	Palomar	NEAT	·	810 m	MPC · JPL
268785	2006 TP_{85}	—	October 13, 2006	Kitt Peak	Spacewatch	·	1.0 km	MPC · JPL
268786	2006 TZ_{86}	—	October 13, 2006	Kitt Peak	Spacewatch	·	670 m	MPC · JPL
268787	2006 TD_{92}	—	October 13, 2006	Kitt Peak	Spacewatch	·	1 km	MPC · JPL
268788	2006 TC_{94}	—	October 15, 2006	Kitt Peak	Spacewatch	·	730 m	MPC · JPL
268789	2006 TZ_{94}	—	October 15, 2006	San Marcello	San Marcello	·	990 m	MPC · JPL
268790	2006 TH_{106}	—	October 15, 2006	Kitt Peak	Spacewatch	·	830 m	MPC · JPL
268791	2006 UO_{4}	—	October 16, 2006	Kitt Peak	Spacewatch	·	680 m	MPC · JPL
268792	2006 UO_{35}	—	October 16, 2006	Kitt Peak	Spacewatch	·	800 m	MPC · JPL
268793	2006 UJ_{40}	—	October 16, 2006	Kitt Peak	Spacewatch	·	790 m	MPC · JPL
268794	2006 UU_{103}	—	October 18, 2006	Kitt Peak	Spacewatch	·	920 m	MPC · JPL
268795	2006 UB_{129}	—	October 19, 2006	Kitt Peak	Spacewatch	·	790 m	MPC · JPL
268796	2006 UJ_{141}	—	October 19, 2006	Mount Lemmon	Mount Lemmon Survey	·	700 m	MPC · JPL
268797	2006 UO_{177}	—	October 16, 2006	Catalina	CSS	·	910 m	MPC · JPL
268798	2006 UC_{182}	—	October 16, 2006	Catalina	CSS	·	900 m	MPC · JPL
268799	2006 UB_{187}	—	October 19, 2006	Catalina	CSS	URS	5.7 km	MPC · JPL
268800	2006 US_{192}	—	October 19, 2006	Catalina	CSS	·	1.1 km	MPC · JPL

== 268801–268900 ==
back to top

Designation			Discovery			Properties		Ref
Permanent	Provisional	Named after	Date	Site	Discoverer(s)	Category	Diam.	Ref
268801	2006 UG_{212}	—	October 23, 2006	Kitt Peak	Spacewatch	·	920 m	MPC · JPL
268802	2006 US_{223}	—	October 19, 2006	Catalina	CSS	·	900 m	MPC · JPL
268803	2006 UJ_{233}	—	October 21, 2006	Palomar	NEAT	·	1.3 km	MPC · JPL
268804	2006 UF_{249}	—	October 27, 2006	Mount Lemmon	Mount Lemmon Survey	·	600 m	MPC · JPL
268805	2006 UO_{265}	—	October 27, 2006	Catalina	CSS	·	880 m	MPC · JPL
268806	2006 UZ_{359}	—	October 22, 2006	Kitt Peak	Spacewatch	·	790 m	MPC · JPL
268807	2006 VP_{2}	—	November 3, 2006	Charleston	Astronomical Research Observatory	·	2.1 km	MPC · JPL
268808	2006 VG_{4}	—	November 9, 2006	Kitt Peak	Spacewatch	·	960 m	MPC · JPL
268809	2006 VV_{15}	—	November 9, 2006	Kitt Peak	Spacewatch	·	910 m	MPC · JPL
268810	2006 VL_{17}	—	November 9, 2006	Kitt Peak	Spacewatch	·	930 m	MPC · JPL
268811	2006 VC_{21}	—	November 9, 2006	Lulin	Lin, H.-C., Q. Ye	·	890 m	MPC · JPL
268812	2006 VS_{27}	—	November 10, 2006	Kitt Peak	Spacewatch	·	1.0 km	MPC · JPL
268813	2006 VO_{37}	—	November 11, 2006	Catalina	CSS	·	770 m	MPC · JPL
268814	2006 VV_{45}	—	November 14, 2006	La Sagra	OAM	V	730 m	MPC · JPL
268815	2006 VC_{50}	—	November 10, 2006	Kitt Peak	Spacewatch	NYS	970 m	MPC · JPL
268816	2006 VU_{60}	—	November 11, 2006	Kitt Peak	Spacewatch	·	980 m	MPC · JPL
268817	2006 VQ_{68}	—	November 11, 2006	Kitt Peak	Spacewatch	·	1.1 km	MPC · JPL
268818	2006 VB_{70}	—	November 11, 2006	Kitt Peak	Spacewatch	·	1.3 km	MPC · JPL
268819	2006 VH_{75}	—	November 11, 2006	Kitt Peak	Spacewatch	V	870 m	MPC · JPL
268820	2006 VP_{98}	—	November 11, 2006	Catalina	CSS	·	5.2 km	MPC · JPL
268821	2006 VT_{99}	—	November 11, 2006	Catalina	CSS	·	940 m	MPC · JPL
268822	2006 VQ_{101}	—	November 11, 2006	Kitt Peak	Spacewatch	·	1.9 km	MPC · JPL
268823	2006 VT_{111}	—	November 13, 2006	Kitt Peak	Spacewatch	V	910 m	MPC · JPL
268824	2006 VY_{111}	—	November 13, 2006	Kitt Peak	Spacewatch	·	870 m	MPC · JPL
268825	2006 VP_{119}	—	November 14, 2006	Kitt Peak	Spacewatch	·	790 m	MPC · JPL
268826	2006 VS_{144}	—	November 15, 2006	Catalina	CSS	·	1.1 km	MPC · JPL
268827	2006 VF_{150}	—	November 9, 2006	Palomar	NEAT	·	830 m	MPC · JPL
268828	2006 VD_{172}	—	November 1, 2006	Mount Lemmon	Mount Lemmon Survey	V	850 m	MPC · JPL
268829	2006 WN_{10}	—	November 16, 2006	Socorro	LINEAR	·	1.1 km	MPC · JPL
268830	2006 WH_{11}	—	November 16, 2006	Socorro	LINEAR	·	1.3 km	MPC · JPL
268831	2006 WM_{34}	—	November 16, 2006	Kitt Peak	Spacewatch	·	820 m	MPC · JPL
268832	2006 WL_{39}	—	November 16, 2006	Kitt Peak	Spacewatch	·	1.1 km	MPC · JPL
268833	2006 WA_{60}	—	November 17, 2006	Socorro	LINEAR	·	850 m	MPC · JPL
268834	2006 WF_{68}	—	November 17, 2006	Mount Lemmon	Mount Lemmon Survey	·	1.0 km	MPC · JPL
268835	2006 WY_{85}	—	November 18, 2006	Kitt Peak	Spacewatch	V	860 m	MPC · JPL
268836	2006 WY_{100}	—	November 19, 2006	Socorro	LINEAR	·	1.4 km	MPC · JPL
268837	2006 WS_{102}	—	November 19, 2006	Kitt Peak	Spacewatch	·	710 m	MPC · JPL
268838	2006 WR_{103}	—	November 19, 2006	Kitt Peak	Spacewatch	MAS	900 m	MPC · JPL
268839	2006 WN_{109}	—	November 19, 2006	Kitt Peak	Spacewatch	·	1.0 km	MPC · JPL
268840	2006 WF_{126}	—	November 22, 2006	Catalina	CSS	·	1.1 km	MPC · JPL
268841	2006 WN_{127}	—	November 23, 2006	Catalina	CSS	BAR	1.8 km	MPC · JPL
268842	2006 WK_{128}	—	November 26, 2006	7300	W. K. Y. Yeung	·	750 m	MPC · JPL
268843	2006 WA_{153}	—	November 21, 2006	Mount Lemmon	Mount Lemmon Survey	NYS	1.5 km	MPC · JPL
268844	2006 WF_{158}	—	November 22, 2006	Socorro	LINEAR	V	870 m	MPC · JPL
268845	2006 WE_{174}	—	November 23, 2006	Kitt Peak	Spacewatch	·	990 m	MPC · JPL
268846	2006 WX_{198}	—	November 21, 2006	Mount Lemmon	Mount Lemmon Survey	NYS	1.3 km	MPC · JPL
268847	2006 XZ_{4}	—	December 12, 2006	Great Shefford	Birtwhistle, P.	·	710 m	MPC · JPL
268848	2006 XL_{8}	—	December 9, 2006	Kitt Peak	Spacewatch	·	2.0 km	MPC · JPL
268849	2006 XB_{15}	—	December 10, 2006	Kitt Peak	Spacewatch	·	910 m	MPC · JPL
268850	2006 XE_{23}	—	December 12, 2006	Socorro	LINEAR	·	1.0 km	MPC · JPL
268851	2006 XF_{28}	—	December 13, 2006	Kitt Peak	Spacewatch	NYS	1.4 km	MPC · JPL
268852	2006 XT_{28}	—	December 13, 2006	Catalina	CSS	·	1.2 km	MPC · JPL
268853	2006 XX_{42}	—	December 12, 2006	Mount Lemmon	Mount Lemmon Survey	MAS	810 m	MPC · JPL
268854	2006 XZ_{47}	—	December 13, 2006	Mount Lemmon	Mount Lemmon Survey	ERI	1.6 km	MPC · JPL
268855	2006 XM_{49}	—	December 13, 2006	Mount Lemmon	Mount Lemmon Survey	·	1.4 km	MPC · JPL
268856	2006 XY_{59}	—	December 14, 2006	Kitt Peak	Spacewatch	·	1.4 km	MPC · JPL
268857	2006 XC_{62}	—	December 15, 2006	Kitt Peak	Spacewatch	MAS	1.0 km	MPC · JPL
268858	2006 XV_{64}	—	December 12, 2006	Palomar	NEAT	·	1.2 km	MPC · JPL
268859	2006 XX_{67}	—	December 12, 2006	Kitt Peak	Spacewatch	·	770 m	MPC · JPL
268860	2006 XY_{68}	—	December 11, 2006	Kitt Peak	Spacewatch	NYS	1.2 km	MPC · JPL
268861	2006 XC_{69}	—	December 13, 2006	Catalina	CSS	·	2.2 km	MPC · JPL
268862	2006 YO_{2}	—	December 17, 2006	7300	W. K. Y. Yeung	NYS	1.3 km	MPC · JPL
268863	2006 YJ_{6}	—	December 17, 2006	Mount Lemmon	Mount Lemmon Survey	·	980 m	MPC · JPL
268864	2006 YL_{17}	—	December 21, 2006	Palomar	NEAT	·	1.6 km	MPC · JPL
268865	2006 YC_{19}	—	December 24, 2006	Kitt Peak	Spacewatch	·	1.6 km	MPC · JPL
268866	2006 YY_{34}	—	December 21, 2006	Kitt Peak	Spacewatch	NYS	1.1 km	MPC · JPL
268867	2006 YL_{38}	—	December 21, 2006	Kitt Peak	Spacewatch	·	1.7 km	MPC · JPL
268868	2006 YF_{45}	—	December 21, 2006	Kitt Peak	Spacewatch	MAS	830 m	MPC · JPL
268869	2006 YN_{49}	—	December 21, 2006	Mount Lemmon	Mount Lemmon Survey	·	1.5 km	MPC · JPL
268870	2006 YC_{53}	—	December 27, 2006	Mount Lemmon	Mount Lemmon Survey	NYS	1.2 km	MPC · JPL
268871	2007 AB_{10}	—	January 8, 2007	Mount Lemmon	Mount Lemmon Survey	·	1.4 km	MPC · JPL
268872	2007 AJ_{10}	—	January 9, 2007	Mount Lemmon	Mount Lemmon Survey	MAS	920 m	MPC · JPL
268873	2007 AK_{11}	—	January 14, 2007	Altschwendt	W. Ries	NYS	1.6 km	MPC · JPL
268874	2007 AW_{17}	—	January 14, 2007	Mount Nyukasa	Japan Aerospace Exploration Agency	V	650 m	MPC · JPL
268875	2007 AZ_{20}	—	January 10, 2007	Mount Lemmon	Mount Lemmon Survey	·	1.5 km	MPC · JPL
268876	2007 AU_{21}	—	January 15, 2007	Anderson Mesa	LONEOS	NYS	1.3 km	MPC · JPL
268877	2007 AW_{23}	—	January 10, 2007	Mount Lemmon	Mount Lemmon Survey	·	1.4 km	MPC · JPL
268878	2007 AZ_{23}	—	January 10, 2007	Mount Lemmon	Mount Lemmon Survey	·	2.1 km	MPC · JPL
268879	2007 AK_{25}	—	January 15, 2007	Catalina	CSS	·	2.7 km	MPC · JPL
268880	2007 AD_{31}	—	January 10, 2007	Mount Lemmon	Mount Lemmon Survey	·	1.3 km	MPC · JPL
268881	2007 BY_{2}	—	January 20, 2007	Pla D'Arguines	R. Ferrando	·	1.4 km	MPC · JPL
268882	2007 BQ_{3}	—	January 16, 2007	Socorro	LINEAR	·	1.4 km	MPC · JPL
268883	2007 BN_{8}	—	January 16, 2007	Socorro	LINEAR	MAS	890 m	MPC · JPL
268884	2007 BU_{8}	—	January 17, 2007	Kitt Peak	Spacewatch	NYS	1.3 km	MPC · JPL
268885	2007 BH_{10}	—	January 17, 2007	Kitt Peak	Spacewatch	·	1.7 km	MPC · JPL
268886	2007 BV_{13}	—	January 17, 2007	Kitt Peak	Spacewatch	MAS	900 m	MPC · JPL
268887	2007 BS_{18}	—	January 17, 2007	Palomar	NEAT	MAS	910 m	MPC · JPL
268888	2007 BS_{26}	—	January 24, 2007	Mount Lemmon	Mount Lemmon Survey	NYS	1.7 km	MPC · JPL
268889	2007 BW_{26}	—	January 24, 2007	Mount Lemmon	Mount Lemmon Survey	·	1.4 km	MPC · JPL
268890	2007 BM_{29}	—	January 24, 2007	Mount Lemmon	Mount Lemmon Survey	NYS	1.3 km	MPC · JPL
268891	2007 BY_{29}	—	January 24, 2007	Catalina	CSS	·	1.5 km	MPC · JPL
268892	2007 BD_{30}	—	January 24, 2007	Catalina	CSS	V	990 m	MPC · JPL
268893	2007 BY_{31}	—	January 24, 2007	Socorro	LINEAR	·	1.4 km	MPC · JPL
268894	2007 BG_{40}	—	January 24, 2007	Mount Lemmon	Mount Lemmon Survey	·	2.1 km	MPC · JPL
268895	2007 BK_{41}	—	January 24, 2007	Mount Lemmon	Mount Lemmon Survey	·	1.0 km	MPC · JPL
268896	2007 BS_{41}	—	January 24, 2007	Catalina	CSS	·	1.6 km	MPC · JPL
268897	2007 BO_{42}	—	January 24, 2007	Catalina	CSS	·	1.6 km	MPC · JPL
268898	2007 BT_{49}	—	January 25, 2007	Kitt Peak	Spacewatch	·	1.5 km	MPC · JPL
268899	2007 BY_{49}	—	January 26, 2007	Goodricke-Pigott	R. A. Tucker	NYS	1.4 km	MPC · JPL
268900	2007 BF_{56}	—	January 24, 2007	Socorro	LINEAR	NYS	1.8 km	MPC · JPL

== 268901–269000 ==
back to top

Designation			Discovery			Properties		Ref
Permanent	Provisional	Named after	Date	Site	Discoverer(s)	Category	Diam.	Ref
268901	2007 BA_{57}	—	January 24, 2007	Socorro	LINEAR	NYS	1.5 km	MPC · JPL
268902	2007 BH_{58}	—	January 24, 2007	Mount Lemmon	Mount Lemmon Survey	·	1.6 km	MPC · JPL
268903	2007 BQ_{74}	—	January 17, 2007	Kitt Peak	Spacewatch	·	1.2 km	MPC · JPL
268904	2007 BX_{77}	—	January 17, 2007	Kitt Peak	Spacewatch	·	1.5 km	MPC · JPL
268905	2007 CP	—	February 5, 2007	Palomar	NEAT	PHO	1.2 km	MPC · JPL
268906	2007 CR_{3}	—	February 6, 2007	Mount Lemmon	Mount Lemmon Survey	V	1.1 km	MPC · JPL
268907	2007 CW_{3}	—	February 6, 2007	Mount Lemmon	Mount Lemmon Survey	MAS	1.1 km	MPC · JPL
268908	2007 CW_{6}	—	February 6, 2007	Kitt Peak	Spacewatch	MAS	860 m	MPC · JPL
268909	2007 CQ_{10}	—	February 6, 2007	Mount Lemmon	Mount Lemmon Survey	·	1.2 km	MPC · JPL
268910	2007 CS_{11}	—	February 6, 2007	Palomar	NEAT	·	1.8 km	MPC · JPL
268911	2007 CO_{13}	—	February 7, 2007	Catalina	CSS	NYS	1.6 km	MPC · JPL
268912	2007 CS_{15}	—	February 6, 2007	Palomar	NEAT	·	1.5 km	MPC · JPL
268913	2007 CO_{17}	—	February 8, 2007	Mount Lemmon	Mount Lemmon Survey	·	1.8 km	MPC · JPL
268914	2007 CM_{19}	—	February 5, 2007	Lulin	Lin, H.-C., Q. Ye	·	1.5 km	MPC · JPL
268915	2007 CF_{23}	—	February 7, 2007	Palomar	NEAT	·	1.4 km	MPC · JPL
268916	2007 CB_{24}	—	February 8, 2007	Kitt Peak	Spacewatch	NYS	1.2 km	MPC · JPL
268917	2007 CD_{27}	—	February 8, 2007	Palomar	NEAT	NYS	1.3 km	MPC · JPL
268918	2007 CW_{37}	—	February 6, 2007	Mount Lemmon	Mount Lemmon Survey	·	1.3 km	MPC · JPL
268919	2007 CO_{41}	—	February 7, 2007	Mount Lemmon	Mount Lemmon Survey	·	1.5 km	MPC · JPL
268920	2007 CH_{43}	—	February 8, 2007	Palomar	NEAT	·	2.8 km	MPC · JPL
268921	2007 CW_{44}	—	February 8, 2007	Palomar	NEAT	NYS	1.6 km	MPC · JPL
268922	2007 CK_{45}	—	February 8, 2007	Palomar	NEAT	·	1.9 km	MPC · JPL
268923	2007 CT_{45}	—	February 8, 2007	Palomar	NEAT	·	1.5 km	MPC · JPL
268924	2007 CO_{51}	—	February 8, 2007	Palomar	NEAT	MAS	1.1 km	MPC · JPL
268925	2007 CP_{51}	—	February 8, 2007	Palomar	NEAT	·	1.9 km	MPC · JPL
268926	2007 CA_{56}	—	February 13, 2007	Socorro	LINEAR	NYS	1.2 km	MPC · JPL
268927	2007 DR_{1}	—	February 16, 2007	Mount Lemmon	Mount Lemmon Survey	·	1.7 km	MPC · JPL
268928	2007 DE_{4}	—	February 16, 2007	Mount Lemmon	Mount Lemmon Survey	·	1.6 km	MPC · JPL
268929	2007 DA_{9}	—	February 17, 2007	Kitt Peak	Spacewatch	NYS	1.3 km	MPC · JPL
268930	2007 DT_{9}	—	February 17, 2007	Socorro	LINEAR	·	4.5 km	MPC · JPL
268931	2007 DE_{10}	—	February 17, 2007	Kitt Peak	Spacewatch	·	1.4 km	MPC · JPL
268932	2007 DJ_{10}	—	February 17, 2007	Kitt Peak	Spacewatch	BRG	1.5 km	MPC · JPL
268933	2007 DT_{13}	—	February 17, 2007	Kitt Peak	Spacewatch	·	1.9 km	MPC · JPL
268934	2007 DX_{13}	—	February 17, 2007	Kitt Peak	Spacewatch	·	1.2 km	MPC · JPL
268935	2007 DW_{20}	—	February 17, 2007	Kitt Peak	Spacewatch	·	1.8 km	MPC · JPL
268936	2007 DV_{21}	—	February 17, 2007	Kitt Peak	Spacewatch	·	1.2 km	MPC · JPL
268937	2007 DX_{23}	—	February 17, 2007	Kitt Peak	Spacewatch	·	1.4 km	MPC · JPL
268938	2007 DD_{27}	—	February 17, 2007	Kitt Peak	Spacewatch	EUN	1.1 km	MPC · JPL
268939	2007 DC_{28}	—	February 17, 2007	Kitt Peak	Spacewatch	·	2.2 km	MPC · JPL
268940	2007 DS_{28}	—	February 17, 2007	Kitt Peak	Spacewatch	·	1.3 km	MPC · JPL
268941	2007 DN_{33}	—	February 17, 2007	Kitt Peak	Spacewatch	·	1.3 km	MPC · JPL
268942	2007 DE_{37}	—	February 17, 2007	Kitt Peak	Spacewatch	·	2.4 km	MPC · JPL
268943	2007 DF_{38}	—	February 17, 2007	Kitt Peak	Spacewatch	·	1.4 km	MPC · JPL
268944	2007 DH_{39}	—	February 17, 2007	Kitt Peak	Spacewatch	·	960 m	MPC · JPL
268945	2007 DR_{42}	—	February 17, 2007	Mount Lemmon	Mount Lemmon Survey	·	1.5 km	MPC · JPL
268946	2007 DQ_{44}	—	February 17, 2007	Palomar	NEAT	NYS	1.5 km	MPC · JPL
268947	2007 DU_{44}	—	February 17, 2007	Catalina	CSS	·	2.2 km	MPC · JPL
268948	2007 DS_{46}	—	February 21, 2007	Mount Lemmon	Mount Lemmon Survey	·	1.0 km	MPC · JPL
268949	2007 DZ_{49}	—	February 16, 2007	Palomar	NEAT	MAS	960 m	MPC · JPL
268950	2007 DJ_{51}	—	February 17, 2007	Catalina	CSS	·	1.4 km	MPC · JPL
268951	2007 DW_{53}	—	February 19, 2007	Mount Lemmon	Mount Lemmon Survey	·	1.7 km	MPC · JPL
268952	2007 DG_{55}	—	February 21, 2007	Socorro	LINEAR	·	1.6 km	MPC · JPL
268953	2007 DL_{74}	—	February 21, 2007	Mount Lemmon	Mount Lemmon Survey	·	1.8 km	MPC · JPL
268954	2007 DU_{76}	—	February 22, 2007	Anderson Mesa	LONEOS	V	920 m	MPC · JPL
268955	2007 DS_{77}	—	February 22, 2007	Socorro	LINEAR	(5)	1.3 km	MPC · JPL
268956	2007 DU_{78}	—	February 23, 2007	Kitt Peak	Spacewatch	·	1.7 km	MPC · JPL
268957	2007 DQ_{94}	—	February 23, 2007	Kitt Peak	Spacewatch	·	1.7 km	MPC · JPL
268958	2007 DD_{98}	—	February 25, 2007	Mount Lemmon	Mount Lemmon Survey	NYS	1.3 km	MPC · JPL
268959	2007 DG_{98}	—	February 25, 2007	Mount Lemmon	Mount Lemmon Survey	·	1.7 km	MPC · JPL
268960	2007 DV_{105}	—	February 20, 2007	Lulin	LUSS	·	1.6 km	MPC · JPL
268961	2007 DR_{109}	—	February 17, 2007	Mount Lemmon	Mount Lemmon Survey	MIS	3.3 km	MPC · JPL
268962	2007 EL_{6}	—	March 9, 2007	Mount Lemmon	Mount Lemmon Survey	·	1.3 km	MPC · JPL
268963	2007 EP_{11}	—	March 9, 2007	Nashville	Clingan, R.	·	1.3 km	MPC · JPL
268964	2007 EB_{16}	—	March 9, 2007	Mount Lemmon	Mount Lemmon Survey	SUL	2.4 km	MPC · JPL
268965	2007 EL_{17}	—	March 9, 2007	Mount Lemmon	Mount Lemmon Survey	·	1.9 km	MPC · JPL
268966	2007 EJ_{18}	—	March 9, 2007	Kitt Peak	Spacewatch	·	2.3 km	MPC · JPL
268967	2007 EY_{20}	—	March 10, 2007	Kitt Peak	Spacewatch	·	1.3 km	MPC · JPL
268968	2007 EY_{23}	—	March 10, 2007	Mount Lemmon	Mount Lemmon Survey	·	1.6 km	MPC · JPL
268969	2007 EZ_{24}	—	March 10, 2007	Mount Lemmon	Mount Lemmon Survey	ADE	3.1 km	MPC · JPL
268970	2007 EC_{25}	—	March 10, 2007	Mount Lemmon	Mount Lemmon Survey	EOS	3.2 km	MPC · JPL
268971	2007 ED_{28}	—	March 31, 2003	Kitt Peak	Spacewatch	·	1.7 km	MPC · JPL
268972	2007 EQ_{31}	—	March 10, 2007	Kitt Peak	Spacewatch	RAF	1.1 km	MPC · JPL
268973	2007 EZ_{31}	—	March 10, 2007	Kitt Peak	Spacewatch	·	1.3 km	MPC · JPL
268974	2007 EQ_{40}	—	March 9, 2007	Kitt Peak	Spacewatch	(5)	2.3 km	MPC · JPL
268975	2007 EK_{42}	—	March 9, 2007	Kitt Peak	Spacewatch	·	2.0 km	MPC · JPL
268976	2007 EG_{45}	—	March 9, 2007	Kitt Peak	Spacewatch	·	2.4 km	MPC · JPL
268977	2007 EM_{52}	—	March 11, 2007	Catalina	CSS	·	1.3 km	MPC · JPL
268978	2007 EW_{53}	—	March 11, 2007	Mount Lemmon	Mount Lemmon Survey	·	3.0 km	MPC · JPL
268979	2007 EG_{54}	—	March 11, 2007	Mount Lemmon	Mount Lemmon Survey	·	2.1 km	MPC · JPL
268980	2007 EF_{65}	—	March 10, 2007	Kitt Peak	Spacewatch	·	1.7 km	MPC · JPL
268981	2007 EU_{67}	—	March 10, 2007	Kitt Peak	Spacewatch	·	2.3 km	MPC · JPL
268982	2007 EK_{69}	—	March 10, 2007	Kitt Peak	Spacewatch	·	1.8 km	MPC · JPL
268983	2007 EO_{70}	—	March 10, 2007	Kitt Peak	Spacewatch	·	1.9 km	MPC · JPL
268984	2007 EY_{78}	—	March 10, 2007	Palomar	NEAT	·	3.0 km	MPC · JPL
268985	2007 EH_{80}	—	March 10, 2007	Mount Lemmon	Mount Lemmon Survey	·	2.2 km	MPC · JPL
268986	2007 EC_{83}	—	March 12, 2007	Kitt Peak	Spacewatch	·	2.8 km	MPC · JPL
268987	2007 EG_{87}	—	March 13, 2007	Mount Lemmon	Mount Lemmon Survey	·	2.1 km	MPC · JPL
268988	2007 EC_{89}	—	March 9, 2007	Kitt Peak	Spacewatch	·	1.2 km	MPC · JPL
268989	2007 EM_{90}	—	March 9, 2007	Mount Lemmon	Mount Lemmon Survey	·	950 m	MPC · JPL
268990	2007 EG_{91}	—	March 9, 2007	Catalina	CSS	·	2.0 km	MPC · JPL
268991	2007 EE_{98}	—	April 7, 2003	Kitt Peak	Spacewatch	·	3.9 km	MPC · JPL
268992	2007 EZ_{98}	—	March 11, 2007	Kitt Peak	Spacewatch	·	1.9 km	MPC · JPL
268993	2007 ED_{101}	—	March 11, 2007	Kitt Peak	Spacewatch	·	1.3 km	MPC · JPL
268994	2007 EE_{101}	—	March 11, 2007	Kitt Peak	Spacewatch	·	1.6 km	MPC · JPL
268995	2007 ER_{101}	—	March 11, 2007	Kitt Peak	Spacewatch	·	3.0 km	MPC · JPL
268996	2007 EG_{105}	—	March 11, 2007	Mount Lemmon	Mount Lemmon Survey	·	1.5 km	MPC · JPL
268997	2007 EJ_{105}	—	March 11, 2007	Mount Lemmon	Mount Lemmon Survey	·	1.8 km	MPC · JPL
268998	2007 ES_{108}	—	March 11, 2007	Kitt Peak	Spacewatch	MIS	4.0 km	MPC · JPL
268999	2007 EL_{109}	—	March 11, 2007	Kitt Peak	Spacewatch	·	1.7 km	MPC · JPL
269000	2007 EL_{113}	—	March 12, 2007	Kitt Peak	Spacewatch	·	1.6 km	MPC · JPL

back to top

== See also ==
- Meanings of minor-planet names: 268001–269000
