= Jena glass =

Heat-resistant borosilicate glass

Jena glass (German: Jenaer Glas) is a shock- and heat-resistant glass used in scientific and technological applications, especially in chemistry.

This borosilicate glass was invented by Otto Schott in 1887 in Jena, Germany, where he had established Schott AG with Ernst Abbe and Carl Zeiss. Jena glass is a borosilicate which, in early manufacture, contained added aluminium, magnesium, sodium, and zinc. It was a predecessor to other borosilicate glasses which came into wide use in the twentieth century, such as Pyrex.

== History ==
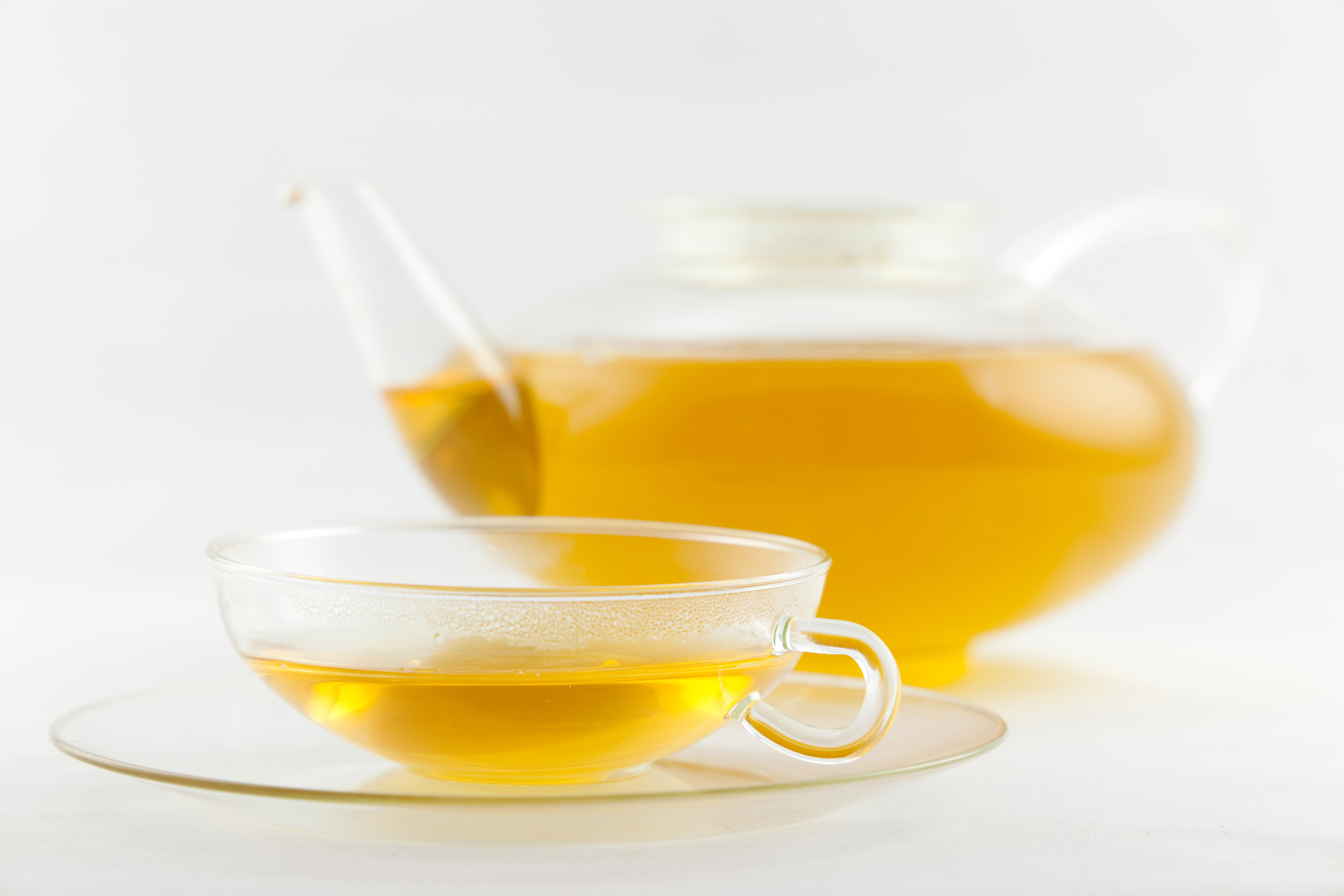
Cup & Pot by Wilhelm Wagenfeld.

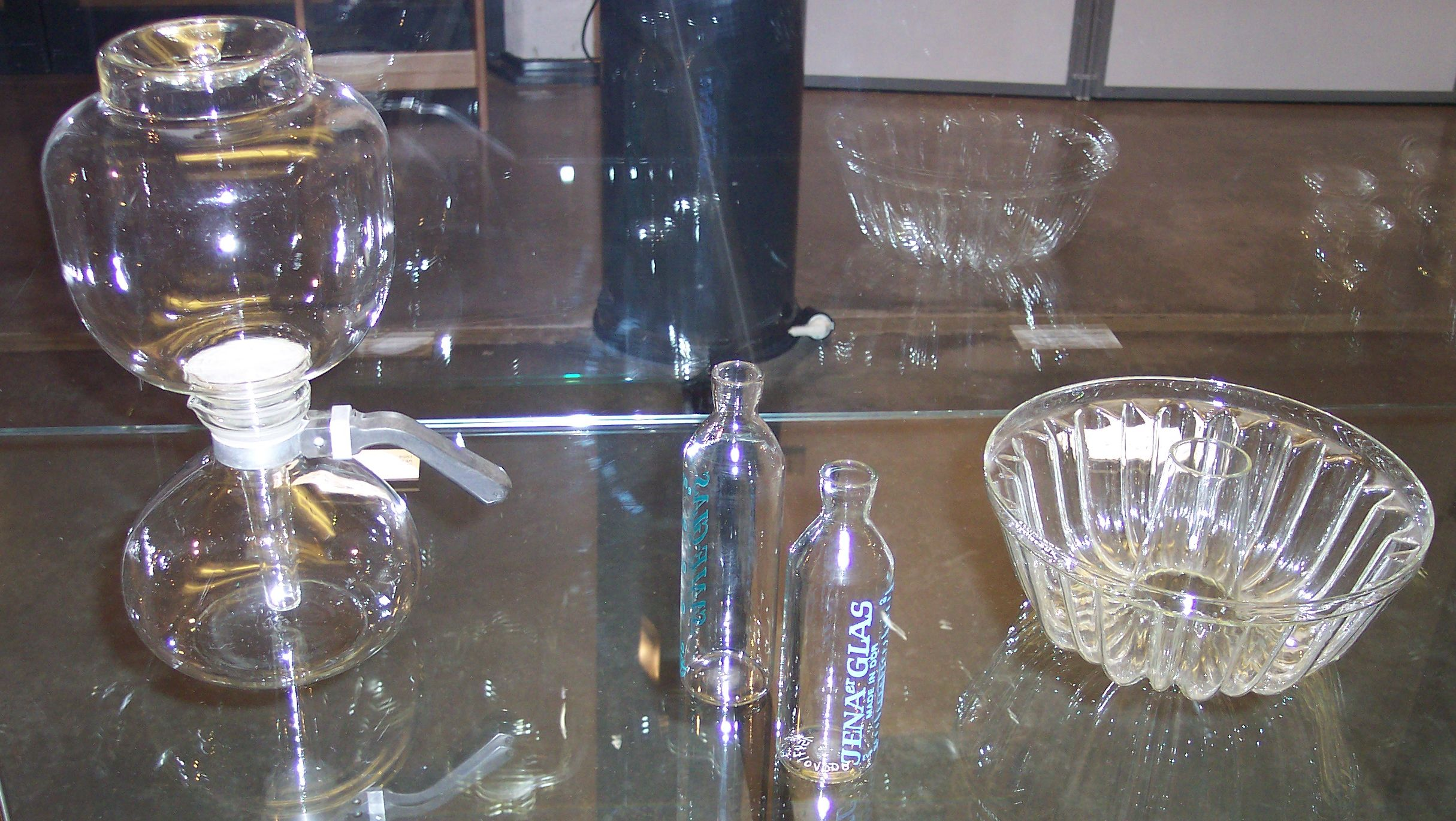
Examples of products made of Jena glass

The "fireproof" utility glass was produced and sold since the 1920s in Jena under the brand name JENAer GLAS. It was used both in industry and in household appliances.

Important designers participated in the shaping of these products since the 1920s: Gerhard Marcks, Wilhelm Wagenfeld, Heinrich Löffelhardt, Bruno Mauder, Ilse Decho and Hans Merz. One of the Bauhaus artist László Moholy-Nagy advertising campaign initiated in the 1930s contributed significantly to its success.

In the GDR, Jena glass was a sought-after export item to the NSW (Non-Socialist Economic Territory) and a valuable foreign exchange earner.

In mid-2005, Schott AG ceased production of Jena glass at the company's founding site in Jena, after several million marks had been invested in a new production line in the 1990s. The last melting furnace was drained and shut down on April 29, 2005. At the end of May 2005, post-processing was closed.

The Jenaer Glas brand remained in the possession of the company, and the license was granted to Zwiesel Kristallglas AG on January 1, 2006, which has since marketed products in the household goods segment under the brand.

Csonka és Fiai Ltd. had been a partner of SCHOTT Jenaer Glas GmbH in the manufacture of heat-resistant glass products since 1996. After Schott stopped manufacturing household glassware, Csonka founded Trendglas Jena GmbH with the former head of the household glassware department of the Jena glassworks, and since 2005 has been continuing the production of heat-resistant household glassware on the original molds and machines of the Jena glassworks under the Trendglas Jena brand. Thus, the company became as processor one of the largest manufacturers of heat-resistant glass products in Europe.

== Products ==
The main products of Jenaer Glas are laboratory glassware and glass tableware.

Typical examples of lab glassware are fireproof beakers and tumblers, and bottles with glass or teflon-coated lids. Glassware is preferred for many uses since it is easy to clean, and there is no risk of contaminants like plasticizers. This virtue has also been transferred to modern consumer products like sustainable water bottles and double-walled coffee takeaway cups.

Glass tableware and cookware offers a wide range, from classical products like teapots and mugs, to casserole dishes, cake pans and whole dining services. The temperature-resistant dishes can be used to cook, bake, serve the food, and freeze leftovers.

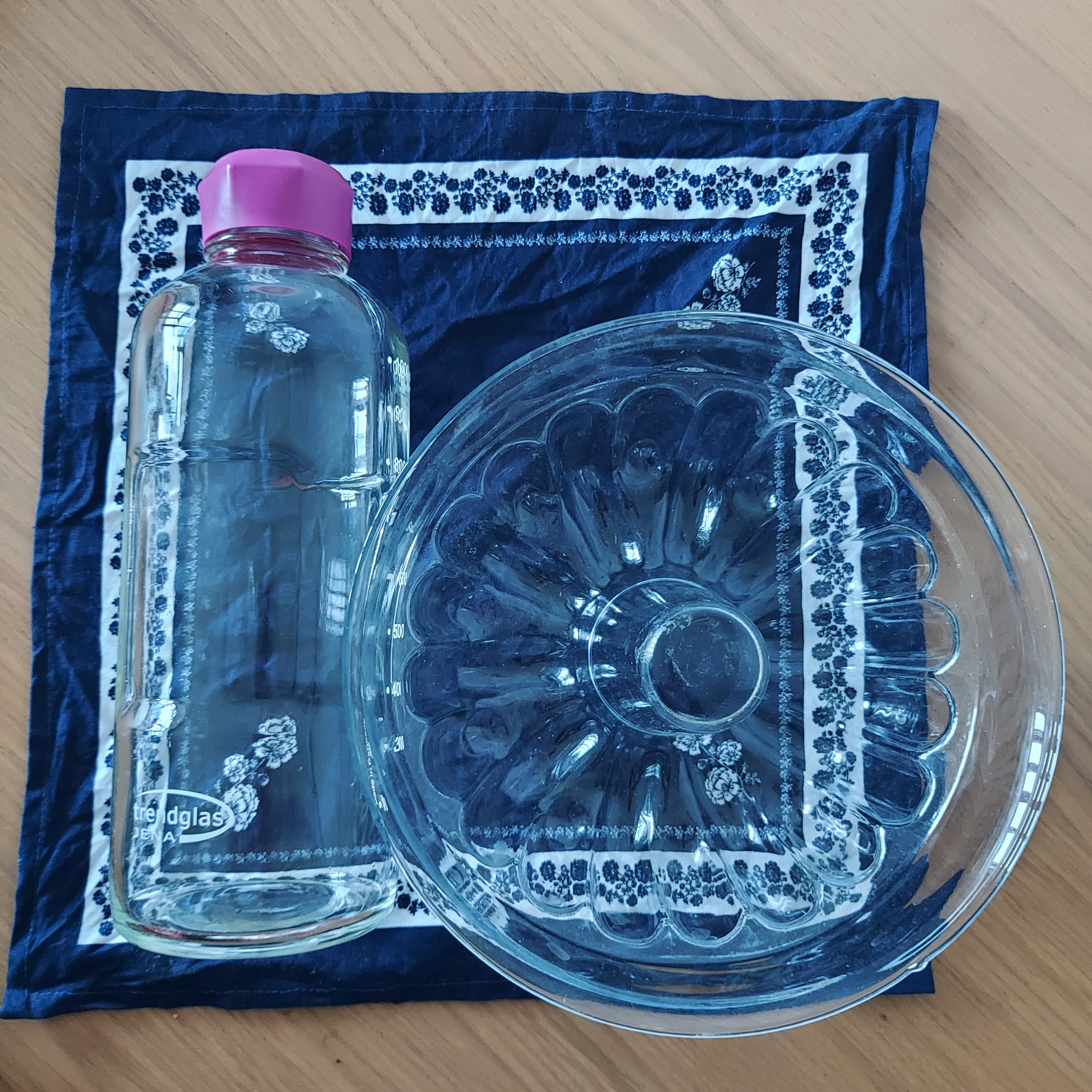
modern everyday kitchenware, 2023
