= Reagent bottle =

Laboratory storage container

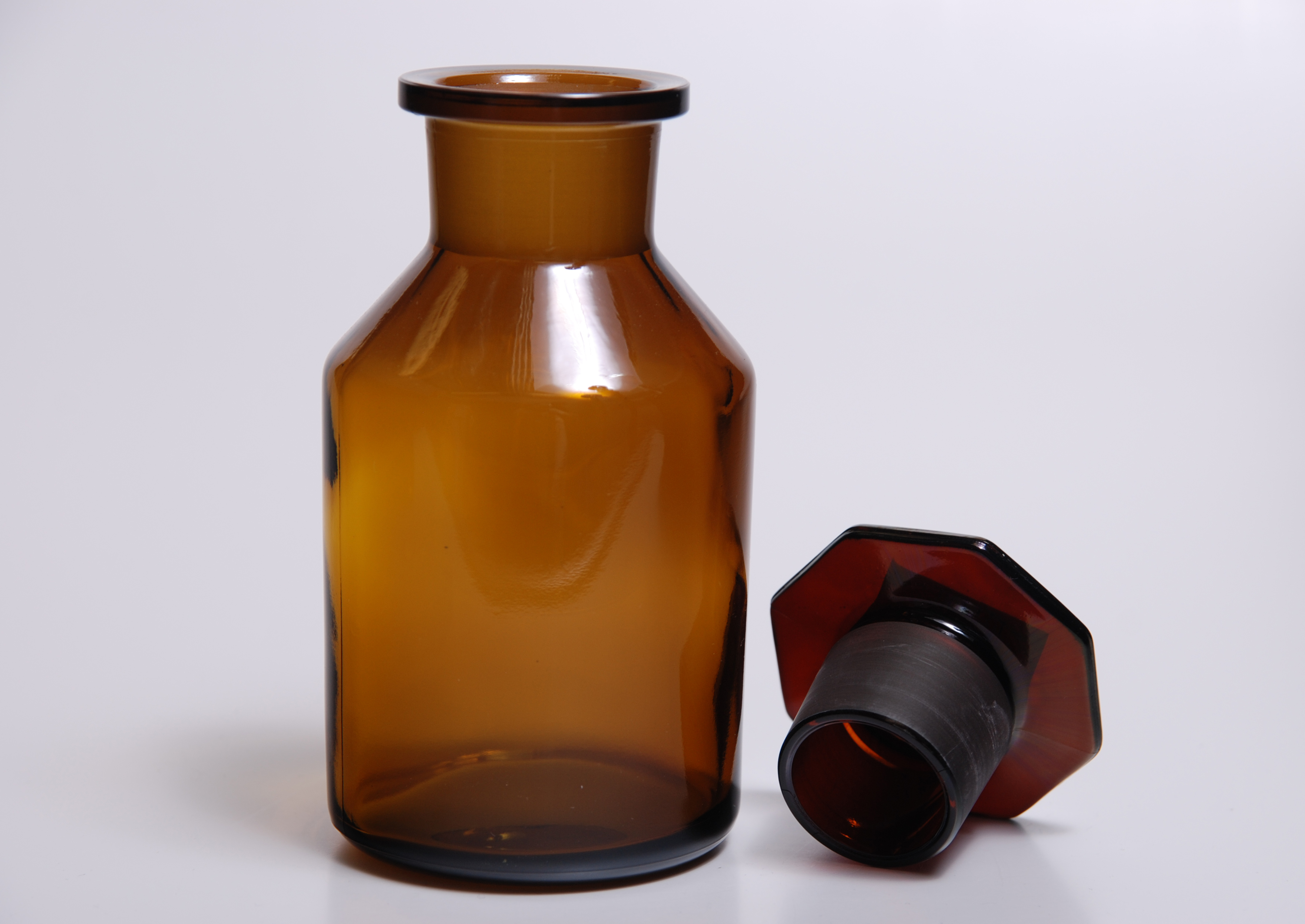
A dark glass bottle with ground glass plug.

Reagent bottles, also known as media bottles or graduated bottles, are containers made of glass, plastic, borosilicate or related substances, and topped by special caps or stoppers. They are intended to contain chemicals in liquid or powder form for laboratories and stored in cabinets or on shelves. Some reagent bottles are tinted amber (actinic), brown or red to protect light-sensitive chemical compounds from visible light, ultraviolet and infrared radiation which may alter them; other bottles are tinted blue (cobalt glass) or uranium green for decorative purposes - mostly vintage apothecary sets, from centuries in which a doctor or apothecary was a prominent figure. The bottles are called "graduated" when they have marks on the sides indicating the approximate (often with a 10% error) amount of liquid at a given level within the container. A reagent bottle is a type of laboratory glassware. The term "reagent" refers to a substance that is part of a chemical reaction (or an ingredient of which), and "media" is the plural form of "medium" which refers to the liquid or gas which a reaction happens within, or is a processing chemical tool such as (for example) a flux.

Several companies produce reagent bottles, including Wheaton, Kimble, Corning, Schott AG, Sklárny Moravia and trademark glass names include Pyrex, Kimax, Duran, Boro and Bomex.

Common bottle sizes include 100 ml, 250 ml, 500 ml, 1000 ml and 2000 ml. Older bottles and those for expensive or medical chemicals, can be found of capacities well under 100 ml.

The selection of caps and stoppers that reagent bottles are closed with are as important as the material the bottles are made of, and the decision as to which cap to use is dependent on the material stored in the container, and the amount of heat which the cap can be subject to. Common cap sizes include 33-430 (33mm), 38-430 (38mm), and GL 45 (45mm). Caps range in size from narrow mouthed to wide mouthed and often a glass or plastic funnel is needed to properly fill a reagent bottle from a larger or equal sized container's mouth. Reagent bottle caps used for microbiology are commonly said to be "autoclavable".

Antique or vintage reagent bottles tend to resemble the classic apothecary bottle and have a glass stopper, very often not of a standard size, so very old bottles and samples should be stored with care, as replacing a missing glass stopper would require dedicated glassworking.

Reagent bottles are subject to regulations and are required to meet global scientific standards.

== See also ==
- Boston round (bottle)
