= Laboratory glassware =

Variety of equipment usually made of glass used for scientific experiments

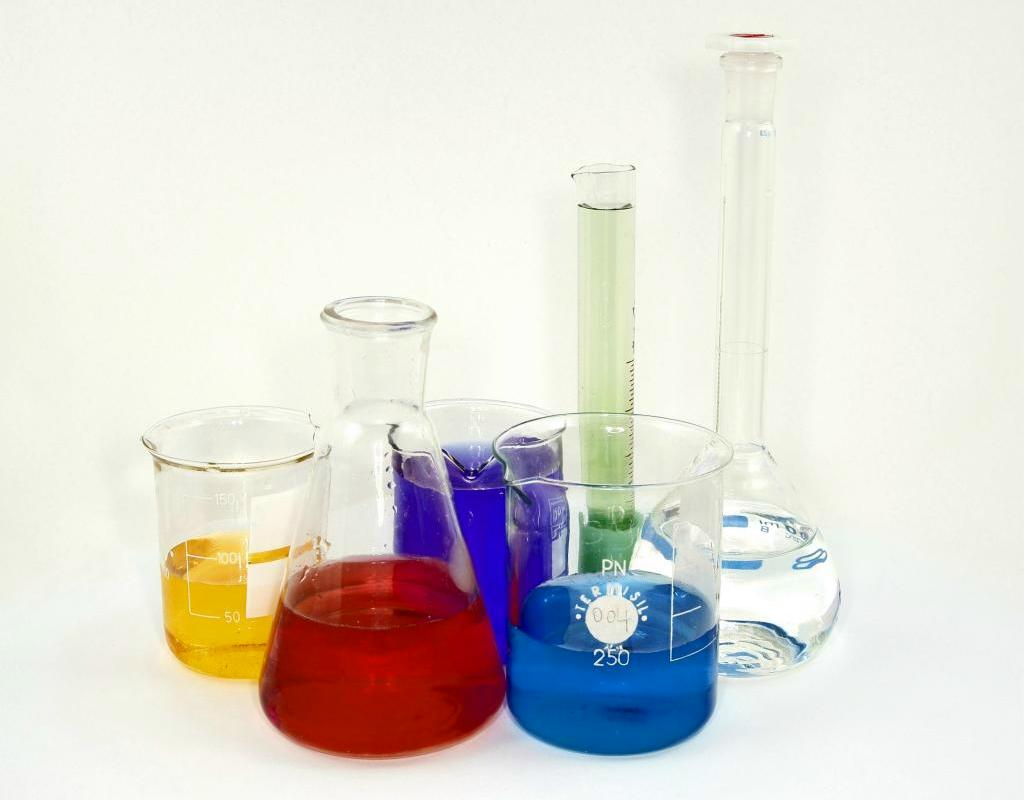
Three beakers, an Erlenmeyer flask, a graduated cylinder and a volumetric flask

Laboratory glassware is a variety of equipment used in scientific work, traditionally made of glass. Glass may be blown, bent, cut, molded, or formed into many sizes and shapes. It is commonly used in chemistry, biology, and analytical laboratories. Many laboratories have training programs to demonstrate how glassware is used and to alert first–time users to the safety hazards involved with using glassware.

== History ==
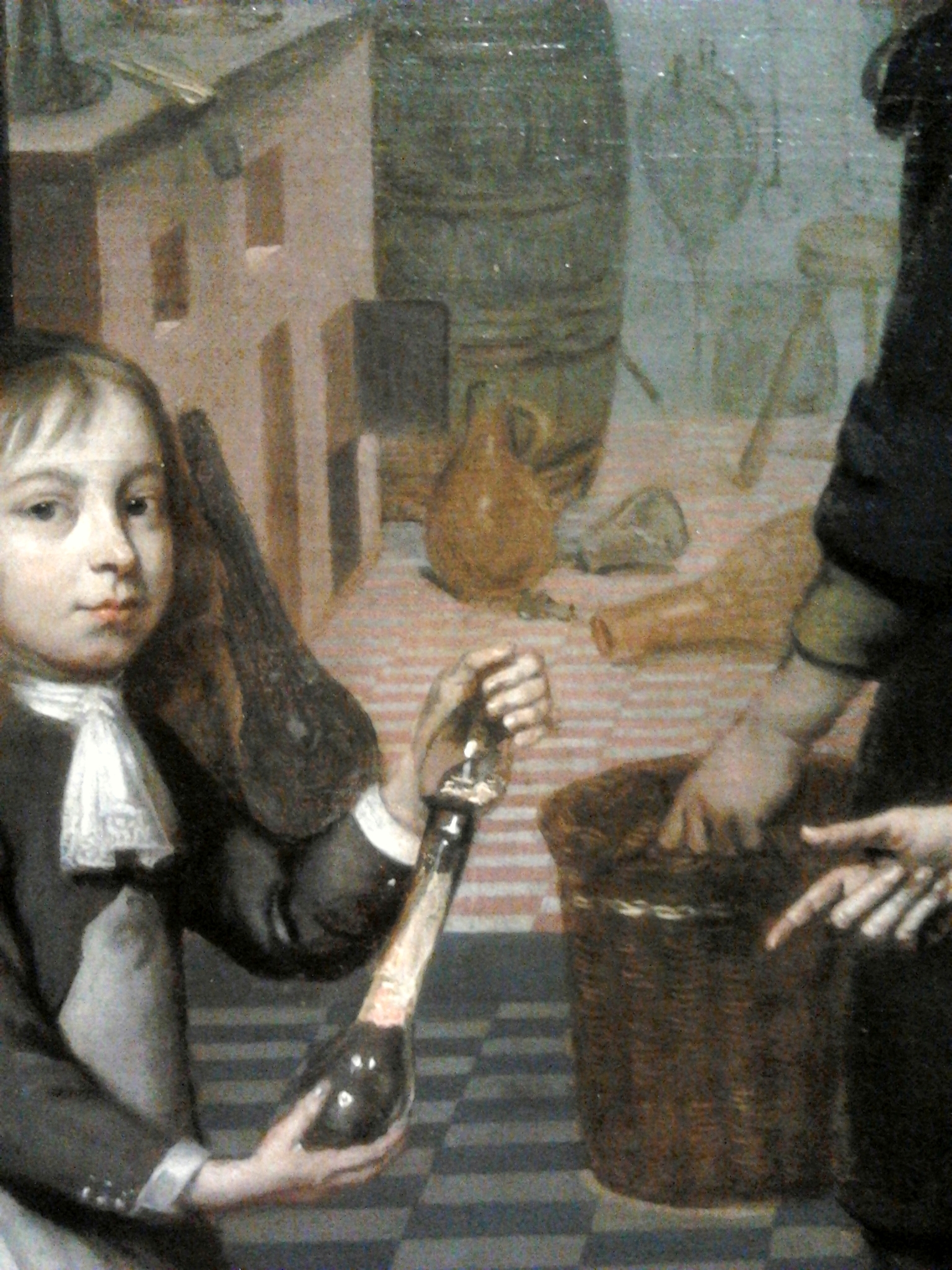
Late 17th-century laboratory glassware in the painting by Cornelis de Man (National Museum in Warsaw).

=== Ancient era ===
The history of glassware dates back to the Phoenicians who fused obsidian together in campfires, making the first glassware. Glassware evolved as other ancient civilizations including the Syrians, Egyptians, and Romans refined the art of glassmaking. Mary the Jewess, an alchemist in Alexandria during the 1st century AD, is credited for the creation of some of the first laboratory glassware handling such as the kerotakis which was used for the collection of fumes from a heated material. Despite these creations, laboratory glassware uses was still limited during this time because of the low thermal stability necessary for experimentation, so equipment was primarily made using copper or ceramic materials instead.

=== Early modern era ===
Glassware improved once again during the 14th–16th century, with the skill and knowledge of glass makers in Venice. During this time, the Venetians gathered knowledge about glassmaking from the East with information coming from Syria and the Byzantine Empire. Along with knowledge about glassmaking, glassmakers in Venice also received higher quality raw materials from the East such as imported plant ash which contained higher soda content compared to plant ash from other areas. This combination of better raw materials and information from the East led to the production of clearer and higher thermal and chemical durability leading towards the shift to the use of glassware in laboratories.

=== Modern era ===
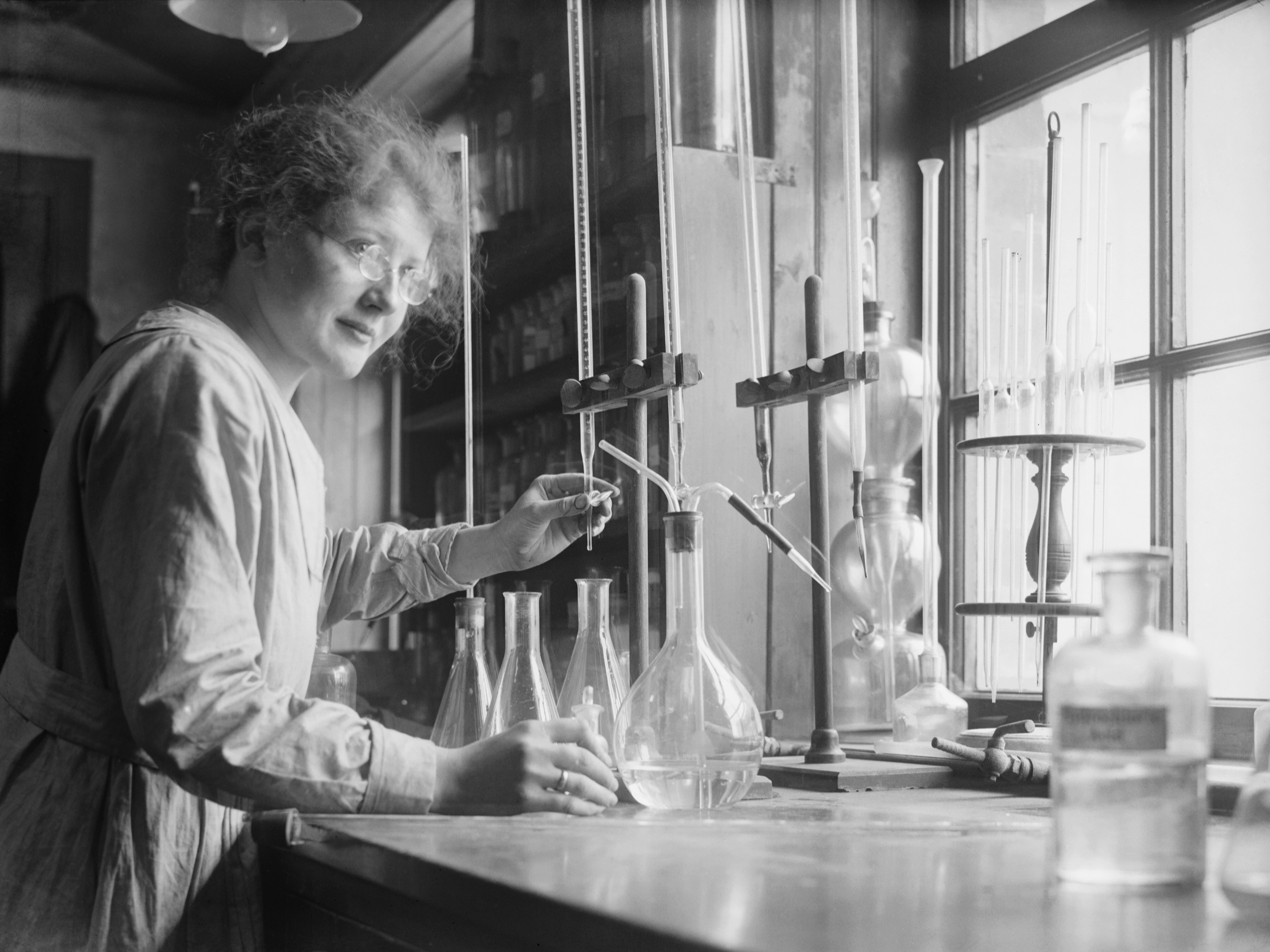
A chemist with laboratory glassware, November 1918

Many glasses that were produced in bulk in the 1830s would quickly become unclear and dirty because of the low quality glass being used. During the 19th century, more chemists began to recognize the importance of glassware due to its transparency, and the ability to control the conditions of experiments. Jöns Jacob Berzelius, who invented the test tube, and Michael Faraday both contributed to the rise of chemical glassblowing. Faraday published Chemical Manipulation in 1827 which detailed the process for creating many types of small tube glassware and some experimental techniques for tube chemistry. Berzelius wrote a similar textbook titled Chemical Operations and Apparatus which provided a variety of chemical glassblowing techniques. The rise of this chemical glassblowing widened the availability of chemical experimentation and led to a shift towards the dominant use of glassware in laboratories. With the emergence of glassware in laboratories, the need for organization and standards arose. The Prussian Society for the Advancement of Industry was one of the earliest organizations to support the collaborative improvement of the quality of glass used.

Following the development of borosilicate glass by Otto Schott in the late 19th century, most laboratory glassware was manufactured in Germany up until the start of World War I. Before World War I, glass producers in the United States had difficulty competing with German laboratory glassware manufacturers because laboratory glassware was classified as educational material and was not subject to an import tax. During World War I, the supply of laboratory glassware to the United States was cut off.

In 1915 Corning Glassworks developed their own borosilicate glass, introduced under the name Pyrex. This was a boon to the war effort in the United States. Though many laboratories turned back to imports after the war ended, research into better glassware flourished. Glassware became more resistant to thermal shock while maintaining chemical inertness.

During the 1920s efforts to standardise the dimensions of laboratory glassware began, particularly for ground glass joints, with some manufacturer specific standardisation beginning to occur around this time. Commercial standards began development around 1930, allowing the compatibility of joints between different manufacturers for the first time, along with other features. This quickly led to the high degree of standardisation and modularity seen in modern glassware.

== Laboratory glassware selection ==
Laboratory glassware is typically selected by a person in charge of a particular laboratory analysis to match the needs of a given task. The task may require a piece of glassware made with a specific type of glass. The task may be readily performed using low cost, mass-produced glassware, or it may require a specialized piece created by a glass blower. The task may require controlling the flow of fluid. The task may have distinctive quality assurance requirements.

=== Type of glass ===
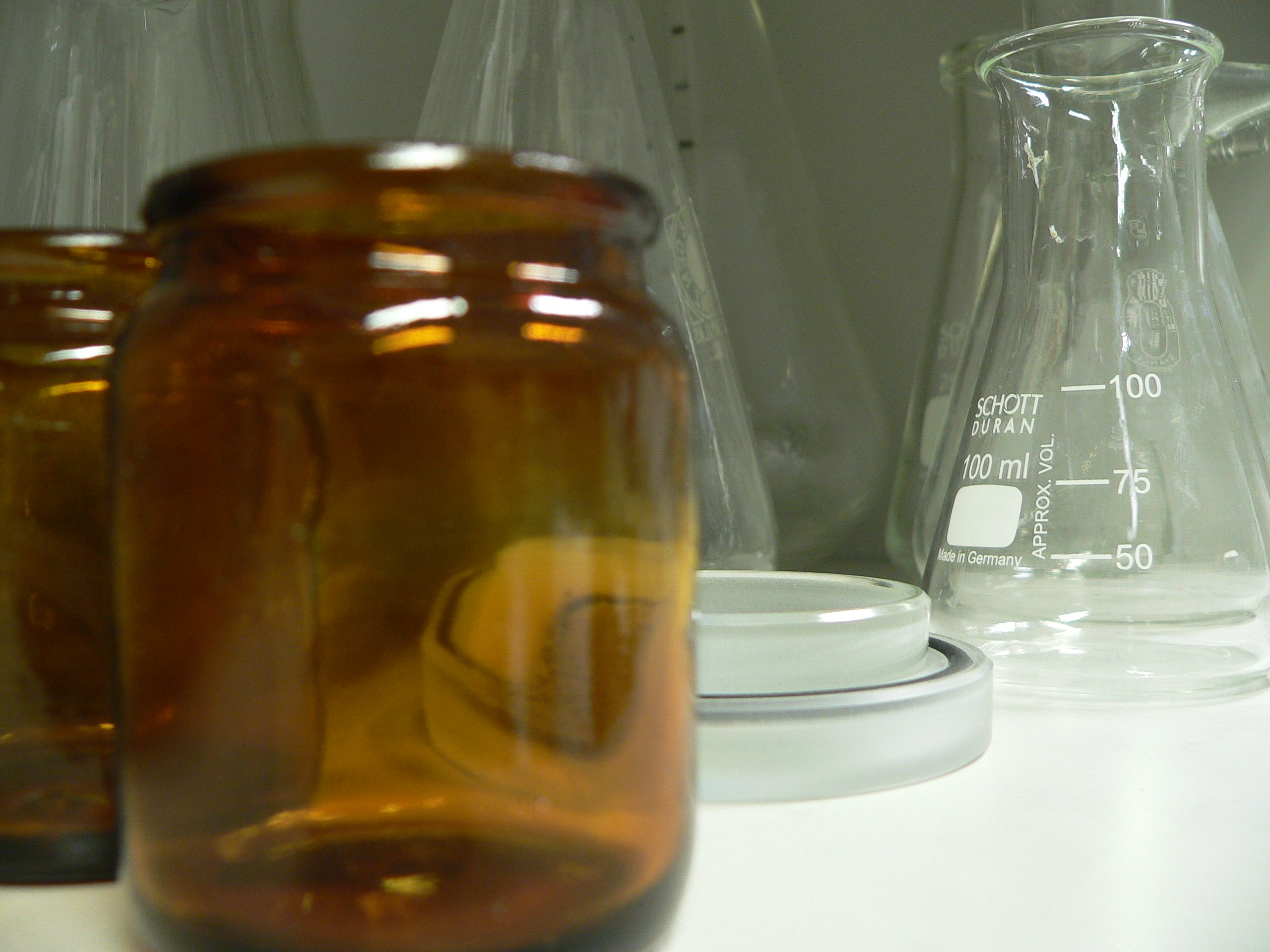
Brown glass jars with some clear lab glassware in the background

Laboratory glassware may be made from several types of glass, each with different capabilities and used for different purposes. Borosilicate glass is a type of transparent glass that is composed of boron oxide and silica, its main feature is a low coefficient of thermal expansion making it more resistant to thermal shock than most other glasses. Quartz glass can withstand very high temperatures and is transparent in certain parts of the electromagnetic spectrum. Darkened brown or amber (actinic) glass can block ultraviolet and infrared radiation. Heavy-wall glass can withstand pressurized applications. Fritted glass is finely porous glass through which gas or liquid may pass. Coated glassware is specially treated to reduce the occurrence of breakage or failure. Silanized (siliconized) glassware is specially treated to prevent organic samples from sticking to the glass.

=== Scientific glass blowing ===
Scientific glass blowing, which is practiced in some larger laboratories, is a specialized field of glassblowing. Scientific glassblowing involves precisely controlling the shape and dimension of glass, repairing expensive or difficult-to-replace glassware, and fusing together various glass parts. Many parts are available fused to a length of glass tubing to create highly specialized piece of laboratory glassware.

=== Controlling fluid flow ===
When using glassware it is often necessary to control the flow of fluid. It is commonly stopped with a stopper. Fluid may be transported between connected pieces of glassware. Types of interconnecting components include glass tubing, T-connectors, Y-connectors, and glass adapters. For a leak-tight connection a ground glass joint is used (possibly reinforced using a clamping method such as a Keck clips). Another way to connect glassware is with a hose barb and flexible tubing. Fluid flow can be switched selectively using a valve, of which a stopcock is a common type fused to the glassware. Valves made entirely of glass may be used to restrict fluid flows. Fluid, or any material which flows, can be directed into a narrow opening using a funnel.

Controlling fluid flow with specific glassware
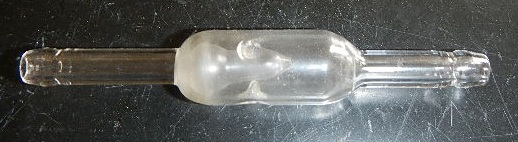
An all-glass check valve.

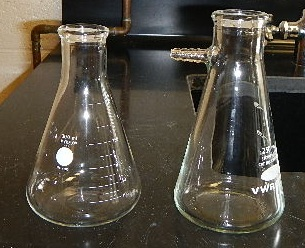
An Erlenmeyer and a filtering flask. Note the barbed sidearm on the filtering flask.

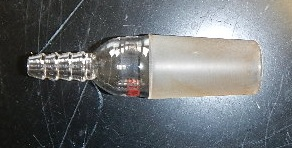
A glass adapter with a hose barb on the left and a ground glass connector on the right.

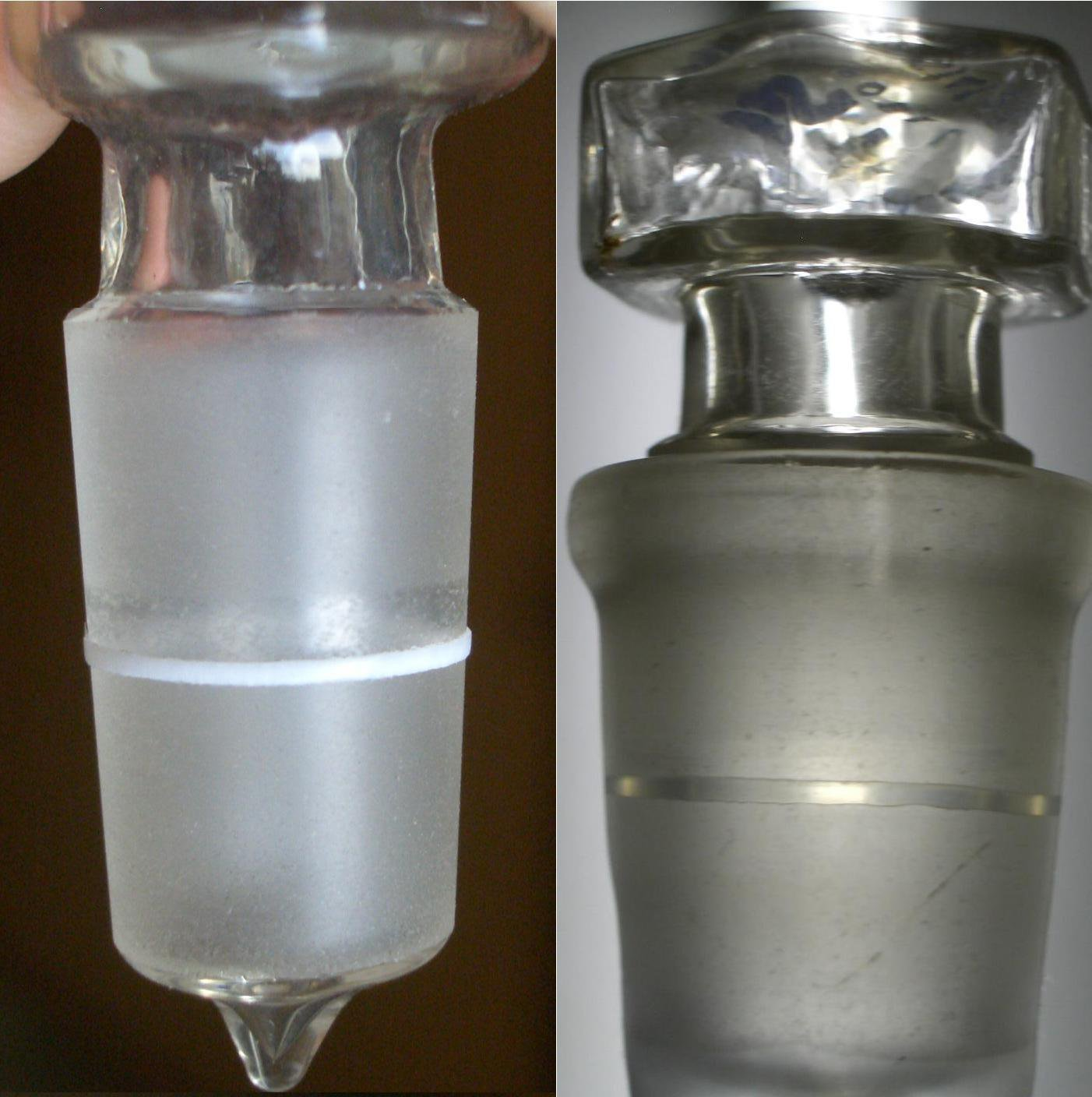
A taper joint stopper with PTFE sealing ring. Note the optical transparency of the narrow sealing ring pressured by glass joint on the right.

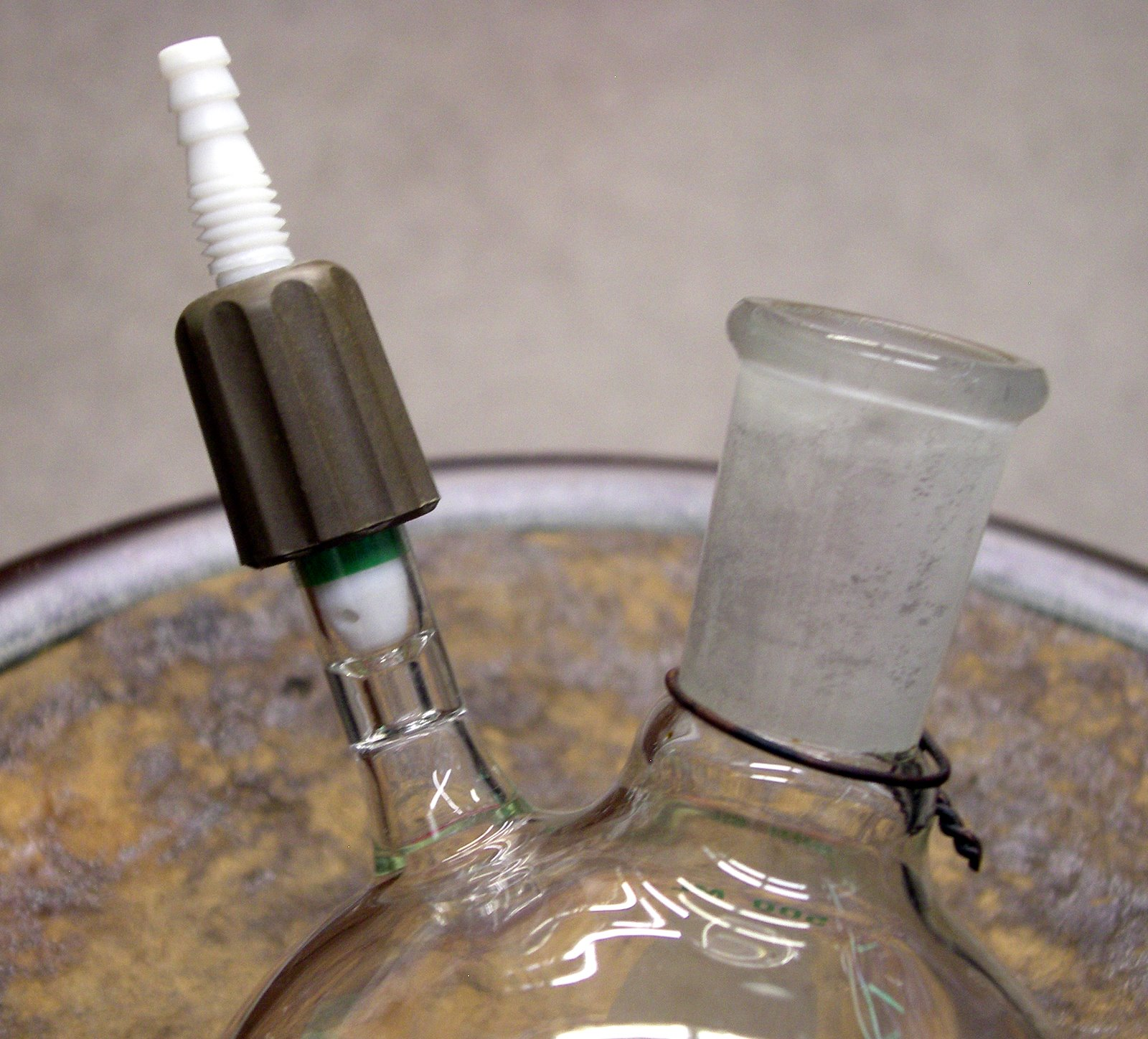
A thread T-bore plug valve used as a side arm on a Schlenk flask.

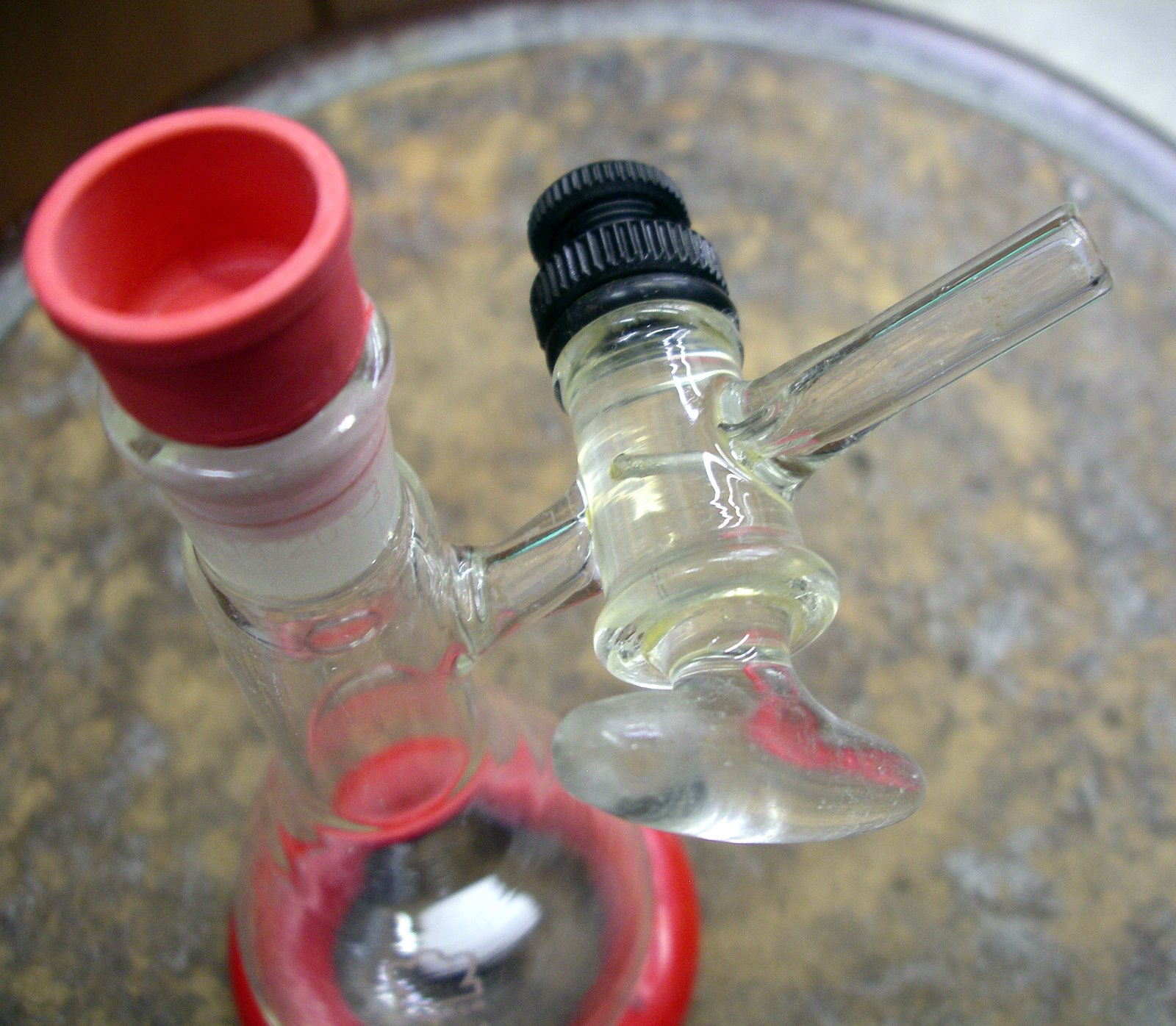
A common straight bore glass stopcock attached with a plastic plug retainer in the side arm of a Schlenk flask.

=== Quality assurance ===
==== Metrology ====
Laboratory glassware can be used for high precision volumetric measurements. With high precision measurements, such as those made in a testing laboratory, the metrological grade of the glassware becomes important. The metrological grade then can be determined by both the confidence interval around the nominal value of measurement marks and the traceability of the calibration to an NIST standard. Periodically it may be necessary to check the calibration of the laboratory glassware.

==== Dissolved silica ====
Laboratory glassware is composed of silica, which is considered insoluble in most substances, with a few exceptions such as hydrofluoric acid or strong alkali hydroxides. Though insoluble, a minute quantity of silica will dissolve in neutral water, which may affect high precision, low threshold measurements of silica in water.

==== Cleaning ====
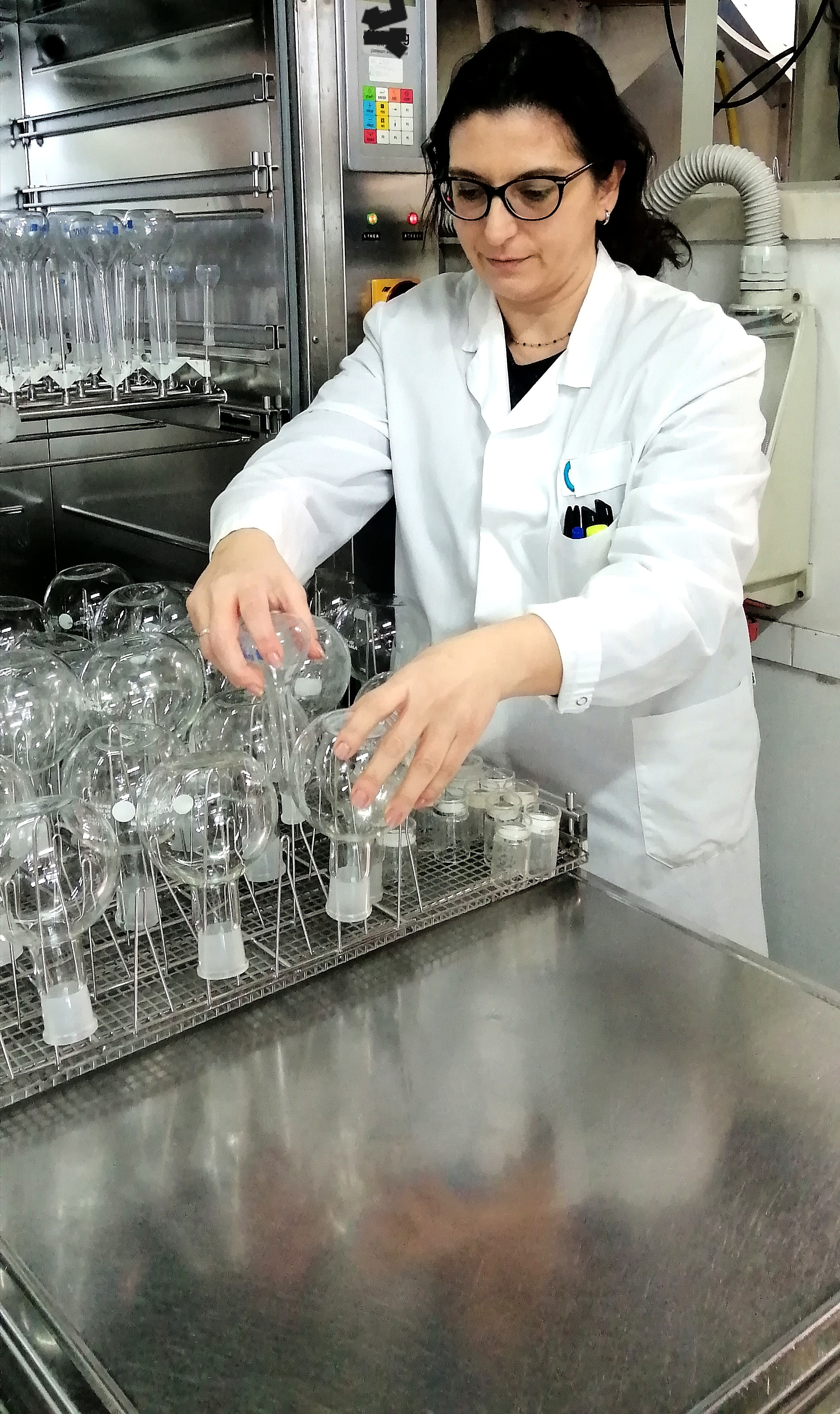
Cleaning laboratory glassware in a dishwasher

Cleaning laboratory glassware is a frequent necessity and may be done using multiple methods depending on the nature of the contamination and the purity requirements of its use. Glassware can be soaked in a detergent solution to remove grease and loosen most contaminations, these contaminations are then scrubbed with a brush or scouring pad to remove particles which cannot be rinsed. Sturdy glassware may be able to withstand sonication as an alternative to scrubbing. Solvents are used to remove organic residues that soap cannot remove, and inorganic residues that do not dissolve in water can often be dissolved with a dilute acid. When cleaning is finished it is common practice to rinse glassware multiple times, often finally with deionised water, before suspending it upside down on drying racks. Specialised dishwashers can be used to automate these cleaning methods.

Resistant residues may require more powerful cleaning methods. Base baths are commonly used for organic residues, although the strong alkaline conditions do slowly dissolve the glass itself, and concentrated hydrochloric acid is common for removing inorganic residues. Even more severe methods exist, such as acidic peroxide (piranha solution), aqua regia, and chromic acid, but these are considered somewhat of a last resort due to the hazards of using them, and their use by students is restricted in many institutions.

For certain sensitive experiments glassware may require specialised procedures and ultra-pure water or solvents to dissolve trace quantities of specific contaminations known to interfere with an experiment.

== Examples ==
There are many different kinds of laboratory glassware items:

Examples of glassware containers include:

- Beakers are simple cylindrical shaped containers used to hold reagents or samples.
- Flasks are narrow-necked glass containers, typically conical or spherical, used in a laboratory to hold reagents or samples. Examples flasks include the Erlenmeyer flask, Florence flask, and Schlenk flask.
- Reagent bottles are containers with narrow openings generally used to store reagents or samples. Small bottles are called vials.
- Jars are cylindrical containers with wide openings that may be sealed. Bell jars are used to contain vacuums.
- Test tubes are used by chemists to hold, mix, or heat small quantities of solid or liquid chemicals, especially for qualitative experiments and assays
- Desiccators of glass construction are used to dry materials or keep material dry.
- Glass evaporating dishes, such as watch glasses, are primarily used as an evaporating surface (though they may be used to cover a beaker).
- The Petri dish is a flat dish filled with a nutritious gelatin that allows for microorganisms to quickly grow, its named after its inventor Julius Petri in the 1880s.
- Microscope slides are thin strips used to hold items under a microscope.

Examples of glassware used for measurements include:

- Graduated cylinders are thin and tall cylindrical containers used for volumetric measurements.
- Volumetric flasks are for measuring a specific volume of fluid.
- Burettes are similar to graduated cylinders but have a valve at the end used to disperse precise amounts of liquid reagents often for titrations.
- Glass pipettes are used to transfer precise quantities of fluids.
- Glass Ebulliometers are used to accurately measure the boiling point of liquids.

Other examples of glassware includes:

- Stirring rods are glass rods used to mix chemicals.
- Condensers are used to condense vapors by cooling them down and turning them into liquids.
- Glass retorts are used for distillation by heating, they have a bulb with a long curved spout.
- Drying pistols are used to free samples from traces of water, or other volatile impurities.
