= Borosilicate glass =

High-strength glass, made of silica and boron trioxide

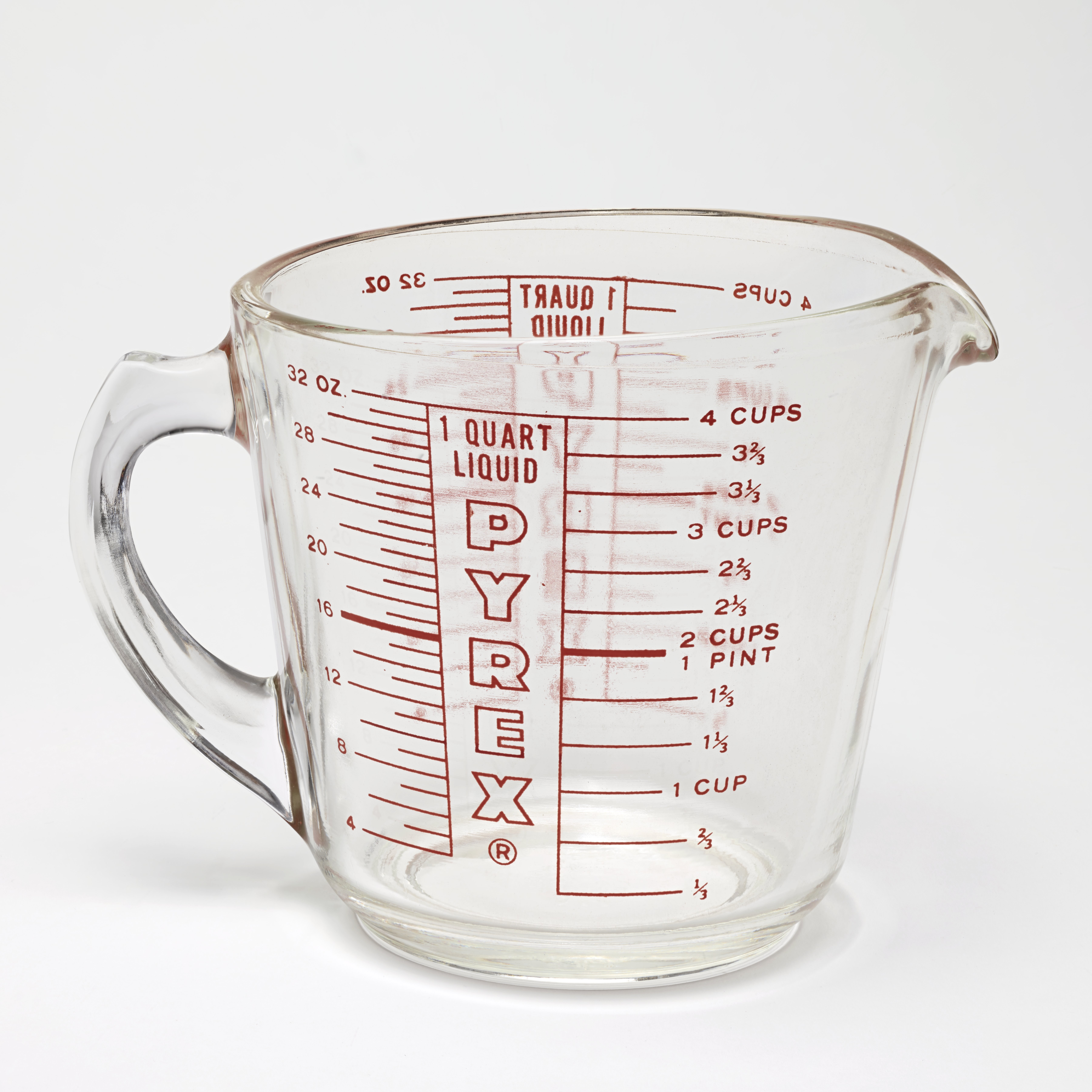
Pyrex is a type of borosilicate glass developed by Corning in 1908, and introduced to the public in 1915 as a line of kitchenware. Pyrex kitchen products no longer use borosilicate in all regions.

Borosilicate glass is glass with silica and boron trioxide as its main constituents. It has numerous advantages over regular soda–lime glass, including being harder to break when dropped, more resistant to cracking from significant changes in temperature, and having a higher clarity (transparency), which is maintained over a longer period of time. Borosilicate is generally slightly more expensive than soda–lime glass.

Borosilicate glasses are known for having very low coefficients of thermal expansion (≈3 × 10^{−6} K^{−1} at 20 °C), making them more resistant to thermal shock than any other common glass. Such glass is subjected to less thermal stress and can withstand temperature differentials of about 330 °F (166 °C) without fracturing. It is commonly used for the construction of reagent bottles and flasks, as well as many other applications.

Borosilicate glass is sold under various trade names, including Borosil, Duran, Pyrex, BSA 60, BSC 51 (by NIPRO), Schott, and others.

Single-ended self-starting lamps are insulated with a mica disc and contained in a borosilicate glass gas discharge tube (arc tube) and a metal cap. They include the sodium-vapor lamp that is commonly used in street lighting.

== History ==
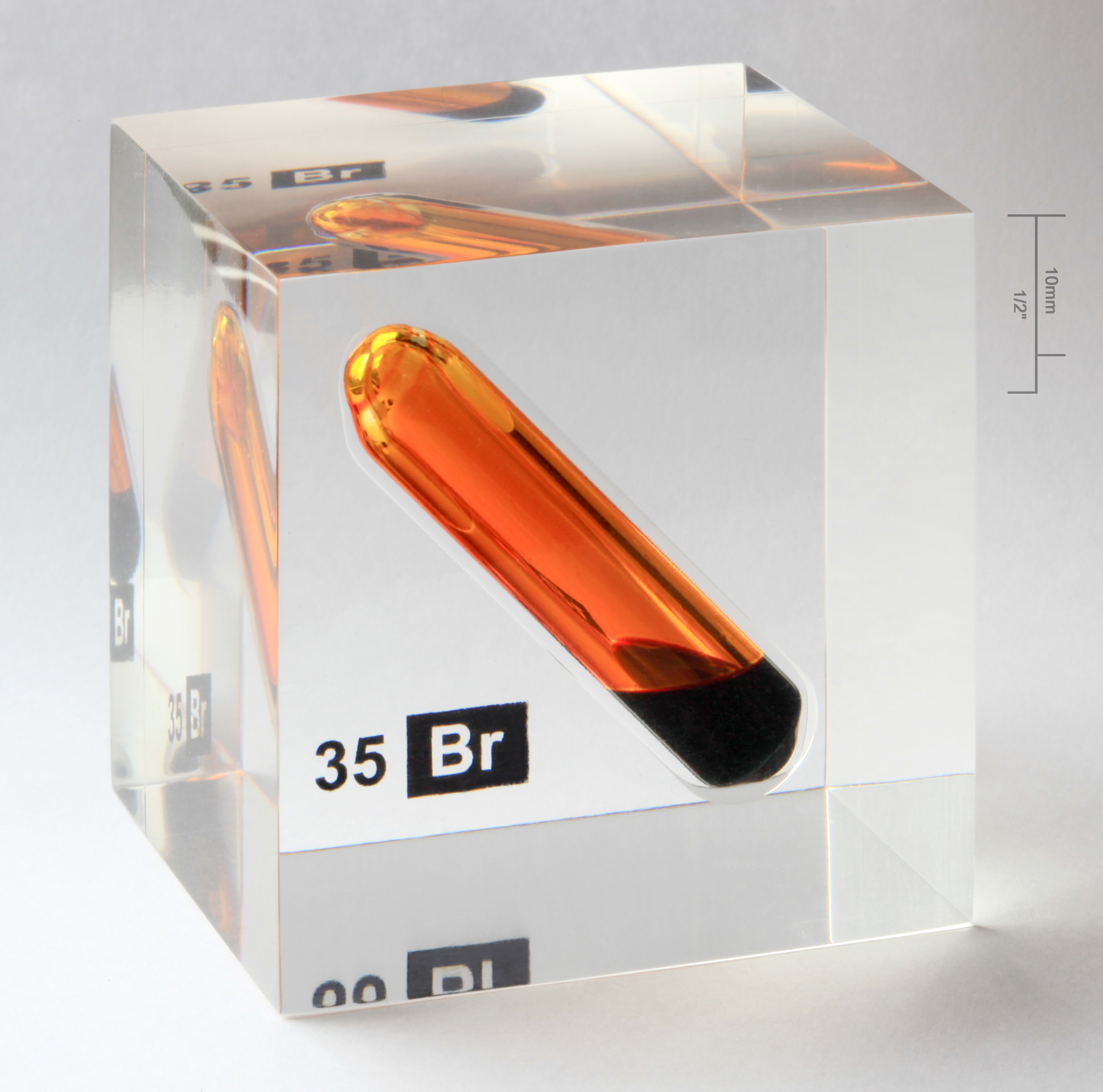
Bromine sealed inside a borosilicate glass vial, which itself is sealed inside a ~5cm cube of PMMA (acrylic)

Borosilicate glass was first developed by German glassmaker Otto Schott in the late 19th century in Jena. This early borosilicate glass thus came to be known as Jena glass.

After Corning Glass Works introduced Pyrex in 1915, the name became synonymous with borosilicate glass in the English-speaking world (although since the 1940s, a sizeable portion of glass produced under the Pyrex brand has also been made of soda–lime glass).

== Manufacturing process ==
Borosilicate glass is created by combining and melting boric oxide, silica sand, soda ash, and alumina. Since borosilicate glass melts at a higher temperature than ordinary silicate glass, some new techniques were required for industrial production.

In addition to quartz, sodium carbonate, and aluminium oxide traditionally used in glassmaking, boron is used in the manufacture of borosilicate glass. The composition of low-expansion borosilicate glass, such as those laboratory glasses mentioned above, is approximately 80% silica, 13% boric oxide, 4% sodium oxide or potassium oxide and 2–3% aluminium oxide. Though more difficult to make than traditional glass due to its high melting temperature, it is economical to produce. Its superior durability, chemical and heat resistance finds use in chemical laboratory equipment, cookware, lighting, and in certain kinds of windows.

The manufacturing process depends on the product geometry and can be differentiated between different methods like floating, tube drawing, or molding.

== Physical characteristics ==
The common type of borosilicate glass used for laboratory glassware has a very low thermal expansion coefficient (3.3 × 10^{−6} K^{−1}), about one-third that of ordinary soda–lime glass. This reduces material stresses caused by temperature gradients, which makes borosilicate a more suitable type of glass for certain applications.

Fused quartzware is even better in this respect (having one-fifteenth the thermal expansion of soda–lime glass); however, the difficulty of working with fused quartz makes quartzware much more expensive, and borosilicate glass is a low-cost compromise. While more resistant to thermal shock than other types of glass, borosilicate glass can still crack or shatter when subjected to rapid or uneven temperature variations.

Among the characteristic properties of this glass family are:

- Different borosilicate glasses cover a wide range of different thermal expansions, enabling direct seals with various metals and alloys like molybdenum glass with a CTE (coefficient of thermal expansion) of 4.6, tungsten with a CTE around 4.0 and Kovar with a CTE around 5.0 because of the matched CTE with the sealing partner
- Allowing high maximum temperatures of typically about 500 °C (930 °F)
- Showing an extremely high chemical resistance in corrosive environments. Norm tests for example for acid resistance create extreme conditions and reveal very low impacts on glass

The softening point (temperature at which viscosity is approximately 10^{7.6} poise) of type 7740 Pyrex is 820 °C (1,510 °F).

Borosilicate glass is less dense (about 2.23 g/cm^{3}) than typical soda–lime glass due to the low atomic mass of boron. Its mean specific heat capacity at constant pressure (20–100 °C) is 0.83 J/(g⋅K), roughly one fifth of water's.

The temperature differential that borosilicate glass can withstand before fracturing is about 330 °F (170 °C), whereas soda–lime glass can withstand only about a 100 °F (40 °C) change in temperature. This is why typical kitchenware made from traditional soda–lime glass (including some modern Pyrex kitchenware) will shatter if a vessel containing boiling water is placed on ice, but borosilicate-glass Pyrex or other borosilicate laboratory glass will not.

Optically, borosilicate glasses are crown glasses with low dispersion (Abbe numbers around 65) and relatively low refractive indices (1.51–1.54 across the visible range).

During manufacture, molten borosilicates tend to have higher liquid 'fragilities' than silicates. This refers to the fact that the viscosity of the molten glass varies more rapidly than exponentially with temperature, and is said to be super-Arrhenian, with the fragility index increasing with boron content. This behaviour can be partly explained by structural changes, including reversible depolymerisation of the glass network upon heating, concomitant with changes in the boron bonding environment, from tetrahedral four-coordinated at lower temperatures, toward trigonal planar three-coordinated at higher temperatures.

=== Families ===
For the purposes of classification, borosilicate glass can be roughly arranged in the following groups, according to their oxide composition (in mass fractions). Characteristic of borosilicate glasses is the presence of substantial amounts of silica (SiO_{2}) and boric oxide (B_{2}O_{3}, >8%) as glass network formers.

The amount of boric oxide affects the glass properties in a particular way. Apart from the highly resistant varieties (B_{2}O_{3} up to a maximum of 13%), there are others that – due to the different way in which the boric oxide is incorporated into the structural network – have only low chemical resistance (B_{2}O_{3} content over 15%). Hence we differentiate between the following subtypes.

==== Non-alkaline-earth ====
The B_{2}O_{3} content for borosilicate glass is typically 12–13% and the SiO_{2} content over 80%. High chemical durability and low thermal expansion (3.3 × 10^{−6} K^{−1}) – the lowest of all commercial glasses for large-scale technical applications – make this a versatile glass material.

High-grade borosilicate flat glasses are used in a wide variety of industries, mainly for technical applications that require either good thermal resistance, excellent chemical durability, or high light transmission in combination with a pristine surface quality. Other typical applications for different forms of borosilicate glass include glass tubing, glass piping, glass containers, etc. especially for the chemical industry.

==== Alkaline-earth ====
In addition to about 75% SiO_{2} and 8–12% B_{2}O_{3}, these glasses contain up to 5% oxides of alkaline earth metal and alumina (Al_{2}O_{3}). This is a subtype of slightly softer glasses, which have thermal expansions in the range (4.0–5.0) × 10^{−6} K^{−1}.

This is not to be confused with simple borosilicate glass-alumina composites.

==== High-borate ====
Glasses containing 15–25% B_{2}O_{3}, 65–70% SiO_{2}, and smaller amounts of alkalis and Al_{2}O_{3} as additional components have low softening points and low thermal expansion. Sealability to metals in the expansion range of tungsten and molybdenum and high electrical insulation are their most important features.

The increased B_{2}O_{3} content reduces the chemical resistance; in this respect, high-borate borosilicate glasses differ widely from non-alkaline-earth and alkaline-earth borosilicate glasses. Among these are also borosilicate glasses that transmit UV light down to 180 nm, which combine the best of the borosilicate glass and the quartz world.

== Uses ==
Borosilicate glass has widespread uses in health and science, electronics, cookware, lighting, optics, lampwork, nanopartical manufacture, rapid prototyping and other applications.

=== Health and science ===
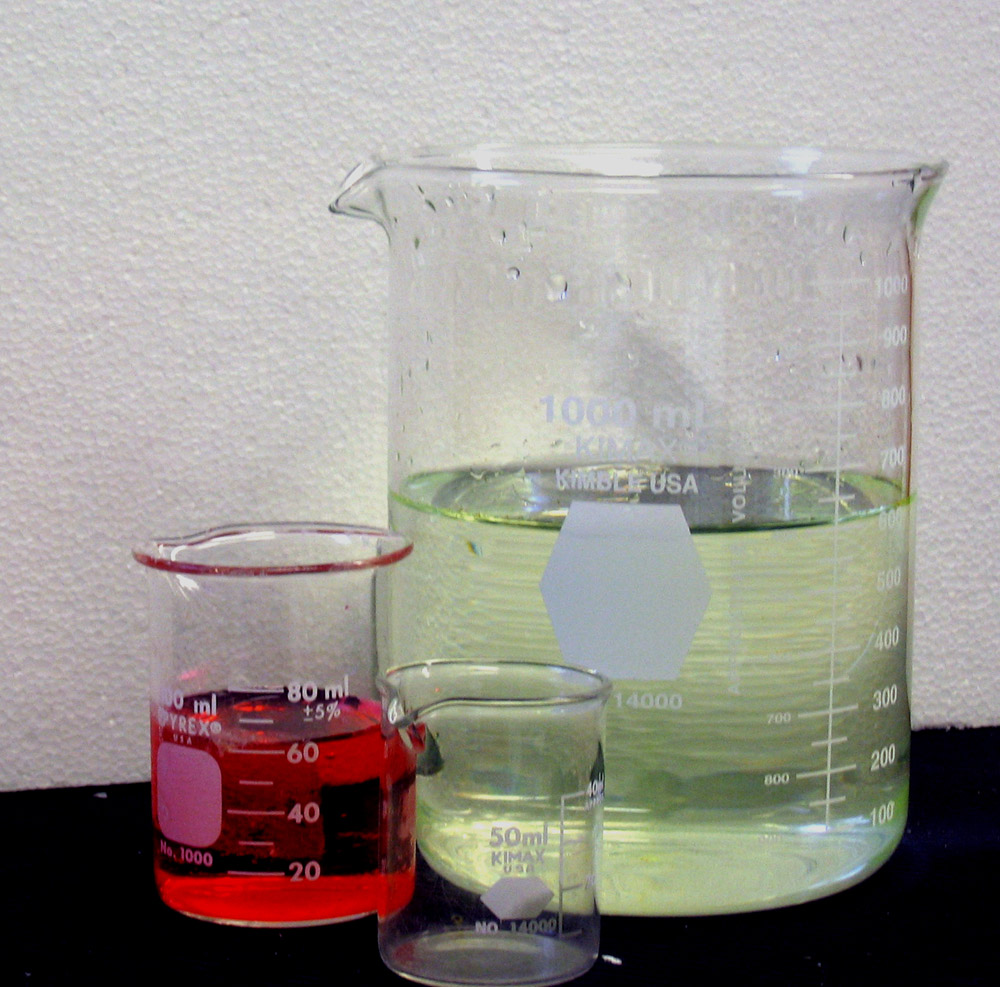
Borosilicate beakers

Virtually all modern laboratory glassware is made of borosilicate glass. It is widely used in this application due to its chemical and thermal resistance and good optical clarity, but the glass can react with sodium hydride upon heating to produce sodium borohydride, a common laboratory reducing agent.

Fused quartz is also found in some laboratory equipment when its higher melting point and transmission of UV are required (e.g. for tube furnace liners and UV cuvettes), but the cost and manufacturing difficulties associated with fused quartz make it an impractical investment for the majority of laboratory equipment.

Additionally, borosilicate tubing is used as the feedstock for the production of parenteral drug packaging, such as vials and pre-filled syringes, as well as ampoules and dental cartridges. The chemical resistance of borosilicate glass minimizes the migration of sodium ions from the glass matrix, thus making it well suited for injectable-drug applications. This type of glass is typically referred to as USP / EP JP Type I.

Borosilicate is widely used in implantable medical devices such as prosthetic eyes, artificial hip joints, bone cements, dental composite materials (white fillings).

Many implantable devices benefit from the unique advantages of borosilicate glass encapsulation. Applications include veterinary tracking devices, neurostimulators for the treatment of epilepsy, implantable drug pumps, cochlear implants, and physiological sensors.

=== Electronics ===
During the mid-20th century, borosilicate glass tubing was used to pipe coolants (often distilled water) through high-power vacuum-tube-based electronic equipment, such as amplifiers for commercial broadcast transmitters. It was also used for the envelope material for glass transmitting tubes which operated at high temperatures.

Borosilicate glasses also have an application in the semiconductor industry in the development of microelectromechanical systems (MEMS), as part of stacks of etched silicon wafers bonded to the etched borosilicate glass.

In 2026, Microsoft's Project Silica was able to use borosilicate wafers as a long-term computer storage medium. Estimates say that a wafer measuring 120 by 120 by 2 mm could store 2.02 terabytes for over 10,000 years

=== Cookware ===
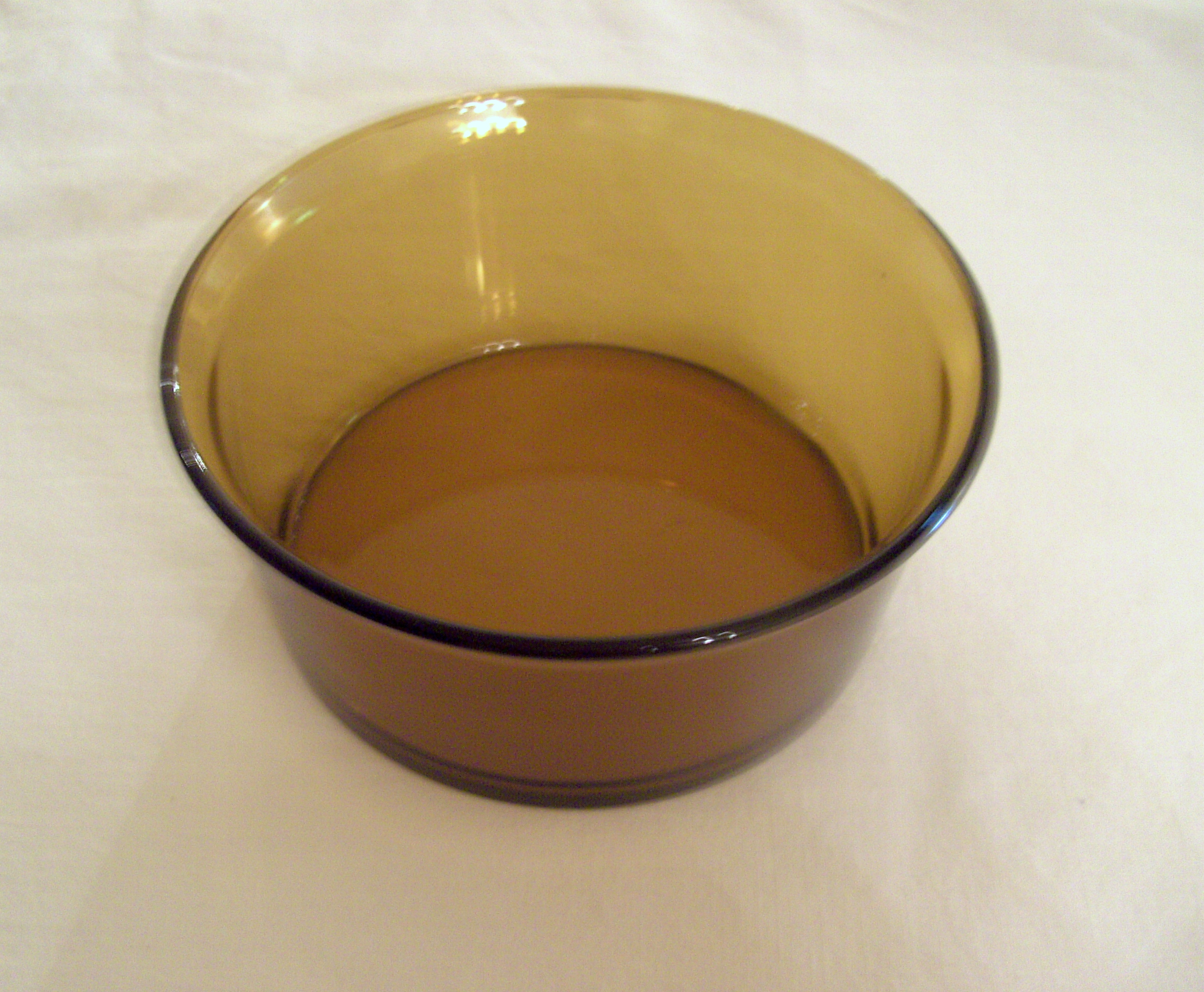
Bakeware by Arc Holdings

Cookware is another common usage for borosilicate glass, including bakeware. It is used for some measuring cups, featuring screen printed markings providing graduated measurements. Borosilicate glass is sometimes used for high-quality beverage glassware, particularly in pieces designed for hot drinks. Items made of borosilicate glass can be thin yet durable, or thicker for extra strength, and are microwave- and dishwasher-safe.

=== Lighting ===
Many high-quality flashlights use borosilicate glass for the lens. This increases light transmittance through the lens compared to plastics and lower-quality glass.

Several types of high-intensity discharge (HID) lamps, such as mercury-vapor and metal-halide lamps, use borosilicate glass as the outer envelope material.

Organic light-emitting diodes (OLED) (for display and lighting purposes) also use borosilicate glass (BK7). The thicknesses of the BK7 glass substrates are usually less than 1 millimeter for OLED fabrication. Due to its optical and mechanical characteristics in relation with cost, BK7 is a common substrate in OLEDs. However, depending on the application, soda–lime glass substrates of similar thicknesses are also used in OLED fabrication.

=== Optics ===
Many astronomical reflecting telescopes use glass mirror components made of borosilicate glass because of its low coefficient of thermal expansion. This makes very precise optical surfaces possible that change very little with temperature, and matched glass mirror components that "track" across temperature changes and retain the optical system's characteristics.

The Hale Telescope's 200 inch mirror is made of borosilicate glass.

The optical glass most often used for making instrument lenses is Schott BK-7 (or the equivalent from other makers, such as the Chinese crown glass K9), a very finely made borosilicate crown glass. It is also designated as 517642 glass after its 1.517 refractive index and 64.2 Abbe number. Other less costly borosilicate glasses, such as Schott B270 or the equivalent, are used to make "crown-glass" eyeglass lenses.

=== Lampwork ===
Borosilicate (or "boro", as it is often called) is used extensively in the glassblowing process lampworking; the glassworker uses a burner torch to melt and form glass, using a variety of metal and graphite tools to shape it into jewelry, kitchenware, sculpture, glass beads, and other items. Borosilicate is referred to as "hard glass" and has a higher melting point (approximately 3,000 °F / 1,648 °C) than "soft glass", which is preferred for glassblowing by beadmakers. Raw glass used in lampworking comes in glass rods for solid work and glass tubes for hollow work tubes and vessels/containers.

Lampworking is used to make complex and custom scientific apparatus; most major universities have a lampworking shop to manufacture and repair their glassware. For this kind of "scientific glassblowing", the specifications must be exact and the glassblower must be highly skilled and able to work with precision. Lampworking is also done as art, and common items made include goblets, paper weights, pipes, pendants, compositions and figurines.

In 1968, English metallurgist John Burton brought his hobby of hand-mixing metallic oxides into borosilicate glass to Los Angeles. Burton began a glass workshop at Pepperdine College, with instructor Margaret Youd. A few of the students in the classes, including Suellen Fowler, discovered that a specific combination of oxides made a glass that would shift from amber to purples and blues, depending on the heat and flame atmosphere.

Fowler shared this combination with Paul Trautman, who formulated the first small-batch colored borosilicate recipes. He then founded Northstar Glassworks in the mid-1980s, the first factory devoted solely to producing colored borosilicate glass rods and tubes for use by artists in the flame. Trautman also developed the techniques and technology to make the small-batch colored boro that is used by a number of similar companies.

=== Nanoparticles ===
It was initially thought that borosilicate glass could not be formed into nanoparticles, since an unstable boron oxide precursor would prevent successful forming of these shapes. However, in 2008 a team of researchers from the Swiss Federal Institute of Technology at Lausanne were successful in forming borosilicate nanoparticles of 100 to 500 nanometers in diameter. The researchers formed a gel of tetraethylorthosilicate and trimethoxyboroxine. When this gel is exposed to water under proper conditions, a dynamic reaction ensues, which results in the nanoparticles.

=== Rapid prototyping ===
Borosilicate glass has become the material of choice for fused deposition modeling (FDM), or fused filament fabrication (FFF), build plates. Its low coefficient of expansion makes borosilicate glass, when used in combination with resistance-heating plates and pads, an ideal material for the heated build platform onto which plastic materials are extruded one layer at a time.

The initial layer of build must be placed onto a substantially flat, heated surface to minimize shrinkage of some build materials (ABS, polycarbonate, polyamide, etc.) due to cooling after deposition. Depending on the material used, the build plate will cycle from room temperature to between 50 and 130 °C (122 and 266 °F) for each prototype that is built. The temperature, along with various coatings (Kapton tape, painter's tape, hair spray, glue stick, ABS+acetone slurry, etc.), ensure that the first layer may be adhered to and remain adhered to the plate, without warping, as the first and subsequent layers cool following extrusion.

Subsequently, following the build, the heating elements and plate are allowed to cool. The resulting residual stress formed when the plastic contracts as it cools, while the glass remains relatively dimensionally unchanged due to the low coefficient of thermal expansion, provides a convenient aid in removing the otherwise mechanically bonded plastic from the build plate. In some cases the parts self-separate as the developed stresses overcome the adhesive bond of the build material to the coating material and underlying plate.

=== Other ===
Aquarium heaters are sometimes made of borosilicate glass. Due to its high heat resistance, it can tolerate the significant temperature difference between the water and the nichrome heating element.

Specialty glass smoking pipes for cannabis and tobacco can be made from borosilicate glass. The high heat resistance makes the pipes more durable. Some harm reduction organizations also give out borosilicate pipes intended for smoking crack cocaine, as the heat resistance prevents the glass from cracking, causing cuts and burns that can spread hepatitis C.

The thermal protection tiles on the Space Shuttle and SpaceX Starship are coated with a borosilicate glass.

Borosilicate glasses are used for immobilisation and disposal of radioactive wastes. In most countries high-level radioactive waste has been incorporated into alkali borosilicate or phosphate vitreous waste forms for many years; vitrification is an established technology.

Vitrification is a particularly attractive immobilization route because of the high chemical durability of the vitrified glass product. The chemical resistance of glass can allow it to remain in a corrosive environment for many thousands or even millions of years.

Borosilicate glass tubing is used in specialty TIG welding torch nozzles in place of standard alumina nozzles. This allows a clear view of the arc in situations where visibility is limited.

== Trade names ==
Borosilicate glass is offered in slightly different compositions under different trade names:

- BK7 of Schott, a borosilicate glass with a high level of purity. Main use in lens and mirrors for laser, cameras and telescopes.
- Borofloat of Schott AG, a borosilicate glass, which is produced to flat glass in a float process.
- Borosil, manufactured by the company of the same name, used in laboratory glassware and microwaveable kitchenware in India
- Boroux is a brand of borosilicate glass drinking bottles.
- Duran of DURAN Group, similar to Pyrex, Simax or Jenaer Glas.
- Endural is a brand name of Holophane
- Fiolax of Schott, mainly used for containers for pharmaceutical applications.
- Ilmabor of TGI (2014 insolvency), mainly used for containers and equipment in laboratories and medicine.
- Jenaer Glas of Zwiesel Kristallglas, formerly Schott AG. Mainly used for kitchenware.
- Kimax is the trademark for borosilicate glassware from Kimble
- Pyrex borosilicate glass of Corning* United Scientific, manufacturers and distributors of laboratory glassware
- Rasotherm of VEB Jenaer Glaswerk Schott & Genossen, for technical glass
- Simax of Kavalierglass a.s., Czechia, produced for both laboratory and consumer markets.
- Supertek, manufacturer of scientific lab equipment and glassware.
- Willow Glass is an alkali free, thin and flexible borosilicate glass of Corning
