= Duran (glass) =

Brand name for borosilicate glass

DURAN®
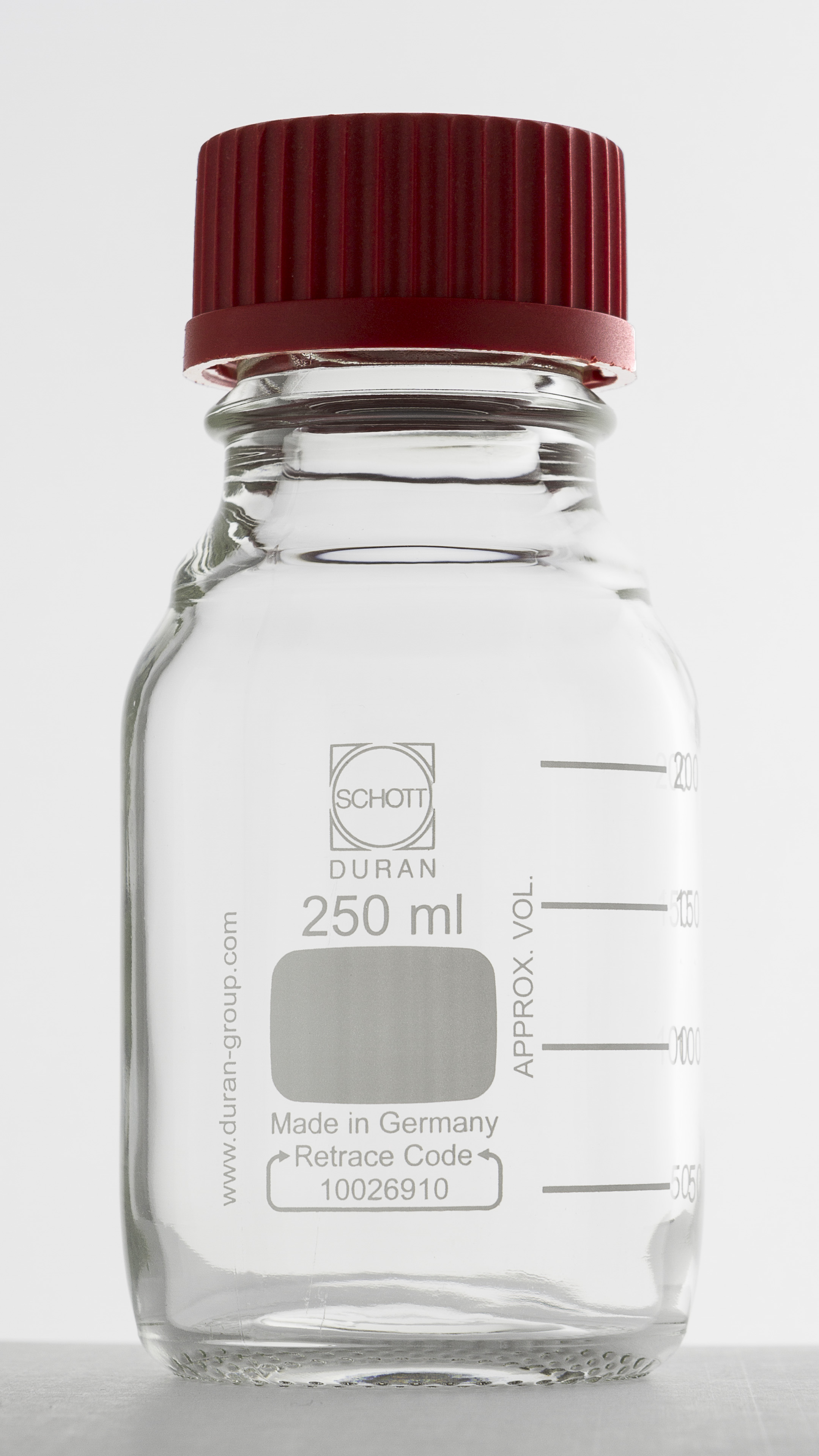
- 250ml DURAN® laboratory bottle
- Country: Germany
- Introduced: 1893
- Markets: Worldwide
- Website: www.dwk.com

DURAN is a brand name for the internationally defined borosilicate glass 3.3 (DIN ISO 3585) produced by the German company DURAN Group GmbH since 2005 under license from the Schott AG, which was the first to develop it, and which sold it from 1893 until the equity carve-out of the DURAN Group in 2005. Because of its high resistance to heat and temperature changes, as well as its high mechanical strength and low coefficient of thermal expansion, DURAN, which Pyrex from Corning is similar to, is not only used for laboratory devices (e.g. components of chemical devices, beakers, Erlenmeyer flasks, etc.) but also in cathode-ray tubes, transmitting tubes, and speculums.

This glass was developed by Otto Schott in 1887. In 1938 the brand DURAN was subscribed at the Reichspatentamt and registered in 1943.

== Milestones ==
1887: Otto Schott invented the glass

1943: The brand was registered for patent under the trade name DURAN

1950: DURAN borosilicate glass tubing became and has remained the standard material in the production of laboratory glass items

2011: Schott was the first to produce DURAN tubing with a length of 10 meters, making it the longest industrially produced glass tube

2015: Schott set a world record by manufacturing DURAN tubing with an outside diameter of 460 mm, the largest ever industrially produced glass tubing

2017: DURAN Group is now DWK Life Sciences.

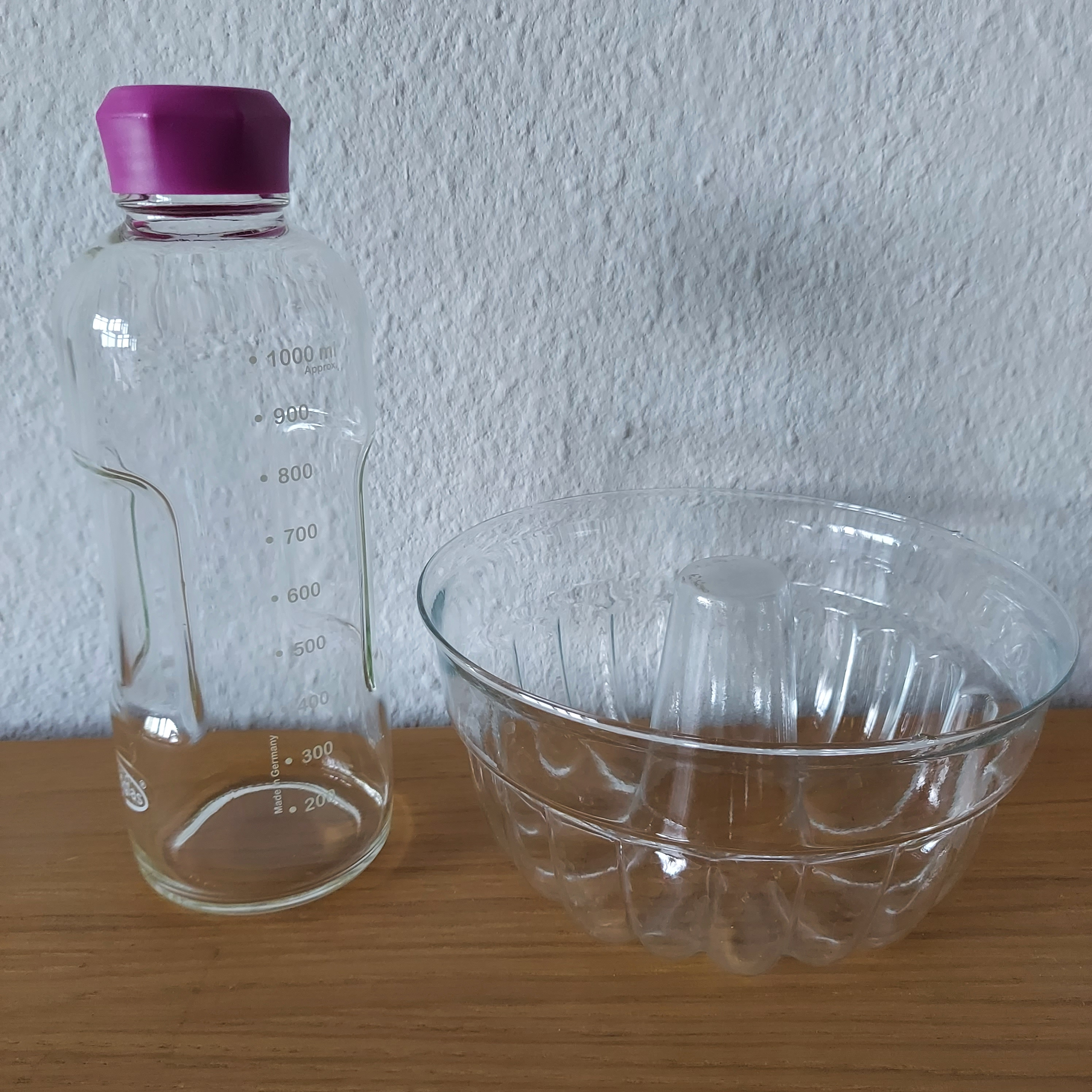
Besides the field of lab glassware, Duran is also used for sustainable household items.

== Properties ==
- High chemical resistance
- Outstanding transmission properties
- High thermal capacity and resistance to thermal shock
- Strong electrical insulator
- transparency in the visible and infrared range of the electromagnetic spectrum
- High resistance to scratches
- Easily cleaned smooth surface

== Applications ==
- Laboratory devices
- Product presentation
- Giftware
- Explosion proof lighting
- Interior design
- Sprinkler fuses
- Photobioreactors for ideal algae growth
- Heat exchangers
- Sight glasses
- Ventilation systems
- Glass Kettles
- Water Pipes

Duran is currently available in hollow glass products. It is either formed by a molding process into final glass products like Erlenmeyer flasks or drawn as a tube. Such tubes are typically a semi-finished product for further processing, which provide higher precision in its cylindrical geometry and better optical clarity than molded hollow glassware.
