= Evaporating dish =

Piece of laboratory glassware

Evaporating dishes
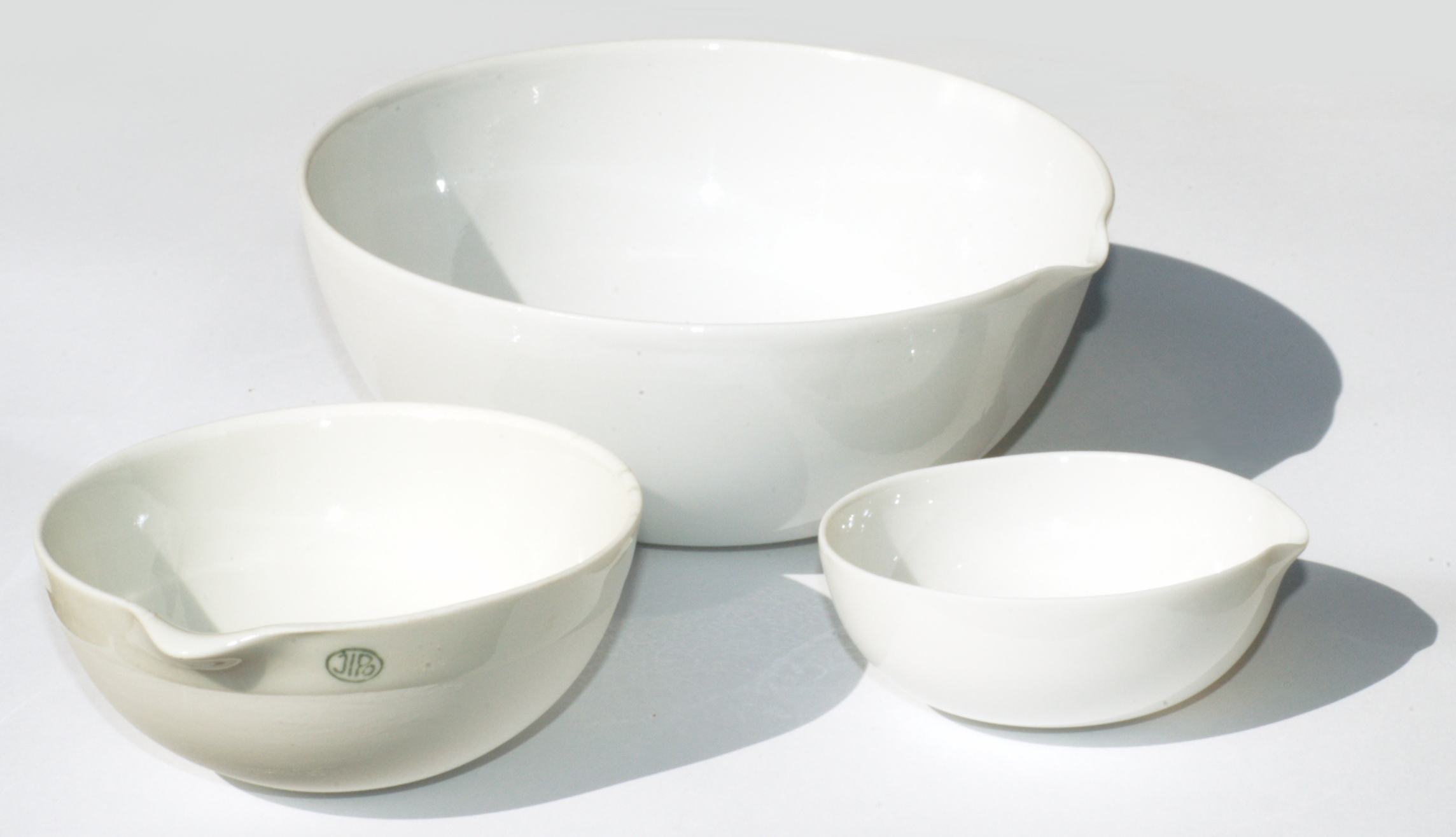
- Three evaporation dishes in various sizes
- Other names: Evaporating basin
- Uses: Evaporation of solids and supernatant fluids
- Related items: Crucible

An evaporating dish is a piece of laboratory glassware used for the evaporation of solutions and supernatant liquids, (Note: A supernatant liquid is a fluid containing a saturated solution of a dissolved compound, overlying a forming precipitate of this compound.) and sometimes to their melting point. Evaporating dishes are used to evaporate excess solvents – most commonly water – to produce a concentrated solution or a solid precipitate of the dissolved substance.

== Description ==
Most evaporating dishes are made of porcelain or borosilicate glass. Shallow glass evaporating dishes are commonly termed "watch glasses", since they resemble the front window of a pocket watch. (Note: Although watch glasses were historically used by Victorian chemists, owing to their cheap availability, the chemist's modern "watch glass" is thicker, flatter and of a heat-resistant glass) Some used for high-temperature work are of refractory metals, usually of platinum, owing to its non-reactive behaviour and low risk of contamination.

The capacity of evaporators is usually small – in the range 3–10 ml. Larger dishes, up to 100 ml, are different in shape, and are more hemispherical.

The evaporator is used most often in quantitative analysis.

== Analysis ==
In the determination of silicon content in an organic sample, a small and accurately-measured quantity of a substance is added to the large amount of sulfuric acid, then heated in an evaporating dish. The dish is heated with a Bunsen burner, until only stable precipitate remains, which contains the silica content. The dish is then closed and heated at high temperature until completely clean, fused silica is produced. Comparison of the initial weight of the substance and that of the fused silica allows the content of silicon in the sample to be determined.

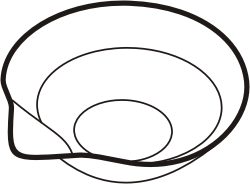
A generic evaporator dish

The shape of the evaporating dish encourages evaporation in two ways:

- The shell is relatively flat. A relatively large liquid surface promotes evaporation.
- If heated in a flask or beaker, a part of the evaporated liquid condenses on the vessel walls and flows back into the solution. This does not happen in a dish.

When heating liquid in an evaporating dish, the low walls encourage splashes and so stirring or swirling of evaporating liquids is considered bad practice, owing to the risk of spillage.

Evaporation, especially in production quantities rather than merely for analysis, is now mostly performed in a rotary evaporator. This is preferred because it works much faster and may be used under vacuum, avoiding unwanted reactions with the atmosphere and allowing control of noxious fumes. Evaporation under vacuum also reduces the severity of bumping and violent ebullition.

== See also ==
- Crucible
