= Glass tube =

Glass tubes are mainly cylindrical hollow-wares. Their special shape combined with the huge variety of glass types (like borosilicate, flint, aluminosilicate, soda lime, lead or quartz glass), allows the use of glass tubing in many applications. For example, laboratory glassware, lighting applications, solar thermal systems and pharmaceutical packaging to name the largest.

In the past, scientists constructed their own laboratory apparatus prior to the ubiquity of interchangeable ground glass joints. Today, commercially available parts connected by ground glass joints are preferred; where specialized glassware are required, they are made to measure using commercially available glass tubes by specialist glassblowers. For example, a Schlenk line is made of two large glass tubes, connected by stopcocks and smaller glass tubes, which are further connected to plastic hoses.

== Industrial Relevance ==
Compared to other materials like plastics the importance of cylindrical half-finished products in glass is high. Main reasons are the difficulty associated with 3-d forming of glass in general. In order to create hollow objects from glass the cylinder shape is a natural starting material.

Cylindrical glass tubes have:

- the lowest surface area and most compact design
- highest mechanical strength against pressure and impact
- automated further processing due to symmetry.

Compared to moulded glass where the process of tube drawing achieves:

- better optical clarity
- more homogeneous distribution of wall thickness
- higher precision or volume and geometry in general.

== History ==
Until the 19th century glass tubes were exclusively produced by mouth blowing, thus discontinuously manufactured from a batch or a glass melt. In 1912, E. Danner (Libbey Glass Company) developed the first continuous tube drawing process in the US, which works in horizontal direction. In 1918 he received a patent. In 1929 a vertical drawing process was developed by L. Sanches-Vello in France.

== Manufacturing Process ==
Glass tubes are produced in various types of glass and in diameters ranging from a few millimeters to several centimeters. In most production processes, an "infinitely long" glass tube is drawn directly from the melt, from which approximately 1.5 m long pieces are chopped off after passing a roller track up to the drawing machine.

Production line for vertical tube drawing, right hand: glass tube in free sag, roller track, drawing machine and take-off device, packaging

The three common methods differ regarding the drawing direction:

=== Drawing direction horizontal ===
==== Danner process ====
Cut through a Danner-tube drawing - blue: rotating Danner pipe with engine and blow-air connection, orange: liquid glass and drawing direction

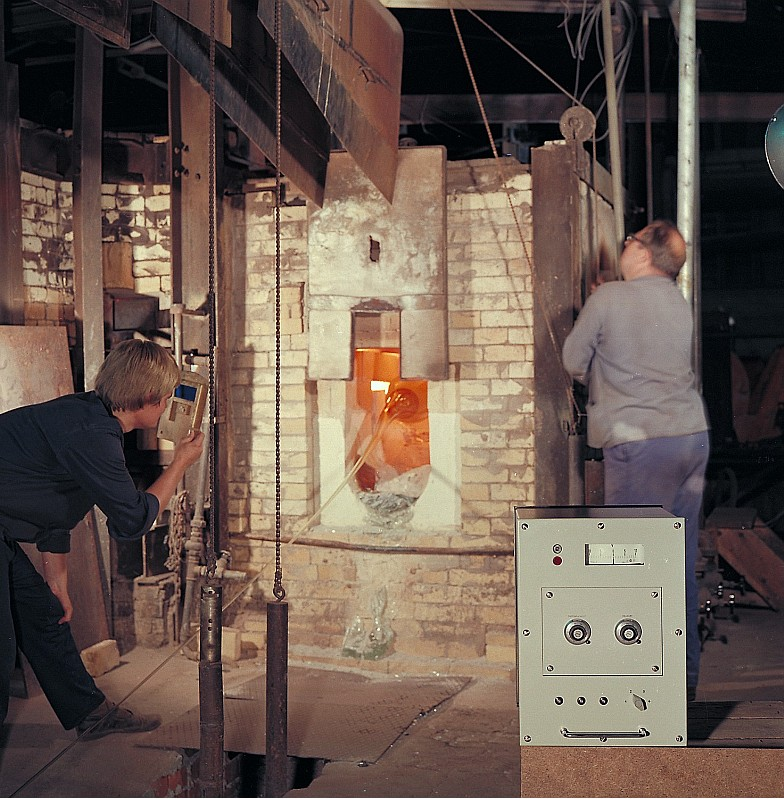
Danner drawing-muffle in the VEB glass factory Weißwasser

In the Danner process, the molten glass runs from the feeder as a belt onto an obliquely downwardly inclined, rotating ceramic hollow cylinder, the Danner pipe. Through the hollow pipe, compressed air is blown to prevent the glass tube from collapsing. At the tip of the pipe the so-called drawing bulb is formed, from which the glass tube is drawn off in the free sag on a horizontal pulling line.

If the drawing speed is kept constantly, an increase in the blow pressure causes larger diameters and smaller wall thicknesses;

With this method, tube diameters between 2 and 60 mm can be realized:

==== Vello process ====
Cut through a Vello tube - blue: mandrel with blown air connection, orange: liquid glass and drawing direction

In the Vello process, the glass runs through an annular opening from the bottom of the feeder. This opening is formed between the round outlet nozzle of the feeder and a height-adjustable hollow needle (also a mandrel). Here, the tube is "inflated" with compressed air as well. The glass tube which initially emerges in the vertical direction is then deflected into the horizontal position in the free sag.

The nozzle mandrel is adjusted off the center of the drawing nozzle in order to produce a constant wall thicknesses after bending.

With this method, tube diameters between 1.5 and 70 mm can be generated; The throughput is higher than it would have been with the Danner method. Furthermore, it is possible here to use glasses with highly volatile components, such as borates (borosilicate glass) and lead oxides (lead glass), since the temperatures at the drawing nozzle are lower than in the Danner muffle.

Without a needle, glass rods can also be produced, whereby the diameter being adjusted via the nozzle as well as the drawing speed. Due to the vertical glass exit, down-draw processes are sporadically also listed under the general term "Vello", although there is no forcible deflection into the horizontal.

Danner and Vello processes are used for the production of thin-walled glass tubes of relatively small diameter, with throughputs of up to 55 tonnes per day.

The world record for the longest ever continuously drawn tube glass in one piece is 10 m hold by Schott AG.

=== Drawing direction downwards (down-draw) ===
The down-draw method is, in principle, the same as the Vello method, although here the glass tube is not deflected but is pulled off in the vertical direction.

In the down-draw, the current world record is held by Schott AG with 460 mm. The achievable wall thicknesses for large outer diameters above 250 mm is about 10 mm. Larger wall thicknesses of up to 15 mm are possible for smaller outer diameters only. For borosilicate glass (35 mm diameter) a drawing speed of 0.3 m/min can be achieved.

=== Drawing direction vertically upwards (vertical drawing) ===
Here, the glass tube is not formed by a mandrel but is drawn off from the free bath surface. A nozzle protrudes from below into a drawing nozzle, via which the air is blown into the glass tube. The nozzle also holds the drawing bulb so that it does not move out laterally. Since the quality and drawing speed achieved during the vertical tube drawing process are relatively low, this process has nowadays almost no practical significance.

=== Further procedures ===
Glass tubes with very large diameters (20 to 100 cm), as required for plants of the chemical industry, are produced by centrifugation or blowing. However, only the production of relatively short tube sections of up to one meter, so-called tube shots, is possible.

== Modifying ==
Much glass tubing can be used right away for example for pneumatic conveying systems, lighting, photobioreactors or as an architectural item. However, modifying of glass tubing is quite common and indispensable for applications like laboratory glass, pharma packaging, and diode encapsulants. Here, the glass tubing needs to be e.g. cut, bent, or even converted into another shape (compare vial, syringes etc.). Mainly, this is done by applying heat to the sample and/or use a mechanical forming tool.

Although modifying glass tubing is no longer an essential laboratory technique, many are still familiar with the basic methods. A glass cutter is used to break pieces of glass tubing into smaller pieces. Freshly cut edges are flame polished before use to remove the rough edge. Glass tubing can be bent by heating evenly over a Bunsen flame to red heat. Hose barbs can be added to tubing, giving a better grip and seal for attaching plastic or rubber tubing.

== Applications ==
Glass tubes are not only produced in round shapes but also in various other shapes such as rectangular, triangular and star-like shape. Glass tubes, rods and profiles can be made from different glass types. They find use in a variety of markets such as pharmaceuticals, industrial and environmental technology as well as electronics. Glass tubes are processed in:

- measuring cylinders
- halogen lamps
- pharmaceuticals packaging
- fluorescent lamps
- photobioreactors
- Interior Design
- Lighting concepts
- product presentation
- backlights
- photo-flash lamps
- pneumatic conveyor systems

== Manufacturers ==
There are several companies concentrating on the production of glass tubes made from special glass types. By using a special glass type with particular properties the glass tubes can be fit for a variety of applications. Some well-known manufacturers of glass tubes are:

- Four Stars Glass Tube Co., Ltd.
- Nipro Glass
- Corning Pharmaceutical Glass
- Schott AG
