= Thermal fracturing in glass =

Stress in glass due to temperature difference

Thermal fracturing in glass occurs when a sufficient temperature differential is created within glass. As a warmed area expands or a cooled area contracts, stress forces develop, potentially leading to fracture. A temperature differential may be created in many ways, including solar heating, space heating devices, fire, or hot and cold liquids. Sloping glass surfaces are subject to greater solar radiation than vertical surfaces and so are more prone to solar thermal fracture. In framed window glass, the edges are relatively cooler than the exposed areas, so space heating devices in very close proximity may cause thermal fracture.

== Factors affecting thermal stress ==
- Solar absorption: the temperature of glass depends on the amount of heat absorbed by the glass. So a high performance solar control glass will absorb more heat. so it will be more prone to thermal fracture
- Shadow: the presence of shadows will result in relatively cooler areas in glass. Thus it results in temperature difference and may result in thermal fracture.
- Edge strength: crack will form if the tensile strength of glass edge exceeds the critical point. Clean cut glass is the strongest and after that polished edge is strongest.
- Artificial heating and cooling: if heating or cooling vents are present, the glass can heat or cool excessively and may result in thermal stress.
- Frame type and colour: insulating materials keep the edges cool but conduction materials are influenced by their colour. dark colours are more absorptive so causes more heating.
- Glass type : edge strength of wired glass is less than of ordinary glasses due to weakening caused by cutting processes.

== Different types of thermal fracture ==
- Low energy: Most common type of fractures. It is caused by damage to the edge of the glass. This weakens the edge, so less stress is required to cause the failure. The probability of this type of thermal fracture cannot be determined using thermal assessment processes.
- High energy: These are rare and require high levels of thermal stress. The probability of this type of thermal fracture can be determined using thermal assessment processes.

== Prevention of thermal fracture ==
- Low energy: edges of annealed laminated glasses are polished. Inspection is done to find damages in glass.
- High energy: glasses are heat strengthened to avoid high energy thermal failure.
