= K9 glass =

Type of borosilicate crown glass

K9 glass, sometimes referred to as K9 crystal, is a variety of optical borosilicate crown glass. The letter "K" is a reference to the German word for "crown" (Krone). K9 glass has high optical clarity, and is used in many contexts requiring this characteristic. It has been regarded as a difficult-to-cut material because of its superior mechanical properties. It has an elastic modulus per pascal of 8 × 10^{10}, a Poisson's ratio of 0.21, and a density of 2510 kilograms per cubic meter. Its refractive index is 1.517 at 590 nm wavelength (compared to 1.523 for crown glass (soda-lime) and 1.618 for 45% leaded glass). Its clarity (90% transmission at 590 nm), combined with low cost have made it desirable for chandeliers, lasers, telescopes, etc.

K9 is produced in large quantities by China, which sells it at a price far below higher-quality well-known glass manufacturers such as Swarovski. A similar product to K9 is BK7.
