= Kimble Chase =

American lab equipment supplier

- Headquarters: Vineland, New Jersey

Kimble Chase, short for Kimble Chase Life Science and Research Products LLC, is headquartered in Vineland, New Jersey. Kimble Chase supplies laboratory equipment and consumables for analytical chemists in the pharmaceutical, scientific, clinical, educational, environmental, industrial, and agricultural markets. In 2007, Kimble Chase was formed through a joint venture between Gerresheimer AG and Thermo Fisher Scientific (NYSE: TMO). The joint venture combines the operations of Pfeiffer Glass, Chase Scientific Glass, Kimble Kontes, and Kimble Mexico in North America, Scherf Praezision in Germany, and KBL and KBG in China.

The two largest operations that now comprise Kimble Chase, Kimble Kontes and Chase Scientific, both started as family businesses in the late 19th century and early 20th century. In the late 19th century, Kimble Glass started making vials, funnels, medicine droppers and culture tubes in a Chicago loft. Founded in 1942, Kontes Glass made high precision, specialty glassware on the top floor of the family-owned Royal Candy Shop. The crown symbol from the candy shop sign is still part of the Kontes logo. Kontes Glass became a sister company to Kimble glass around 1982. Some time in the early years of 2000, Gerresheimer Glass purchased the two companies and shortly thereafter Kontes became known as Kimble-Kontes. Chase Scientific Glass, founded in 1934, is a major supplier of disposable laboratory glassware for North America, Europe and the Asia Pacific. Today, Kimble Chase has 1,500 employees, six manufacturing facilities—located in the United States, Mexico, Germany, and China—and over 10,000 total square feet of production and warehouse space.
