= Hose barb =

Aspirator with a hose barb on the right arm
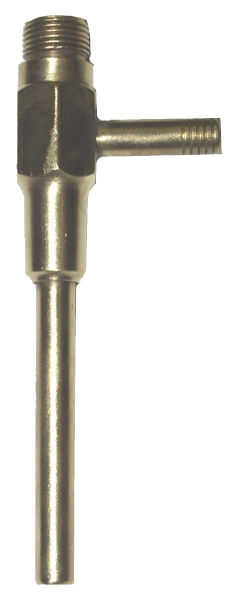
- A copper aspirator. The water inlet and outlet are at the top and bottom, respectively; the air inlet is on the side.

Cross section of a Büchner flask. Note the protruding hose barb, used for attaching a vacuum source.

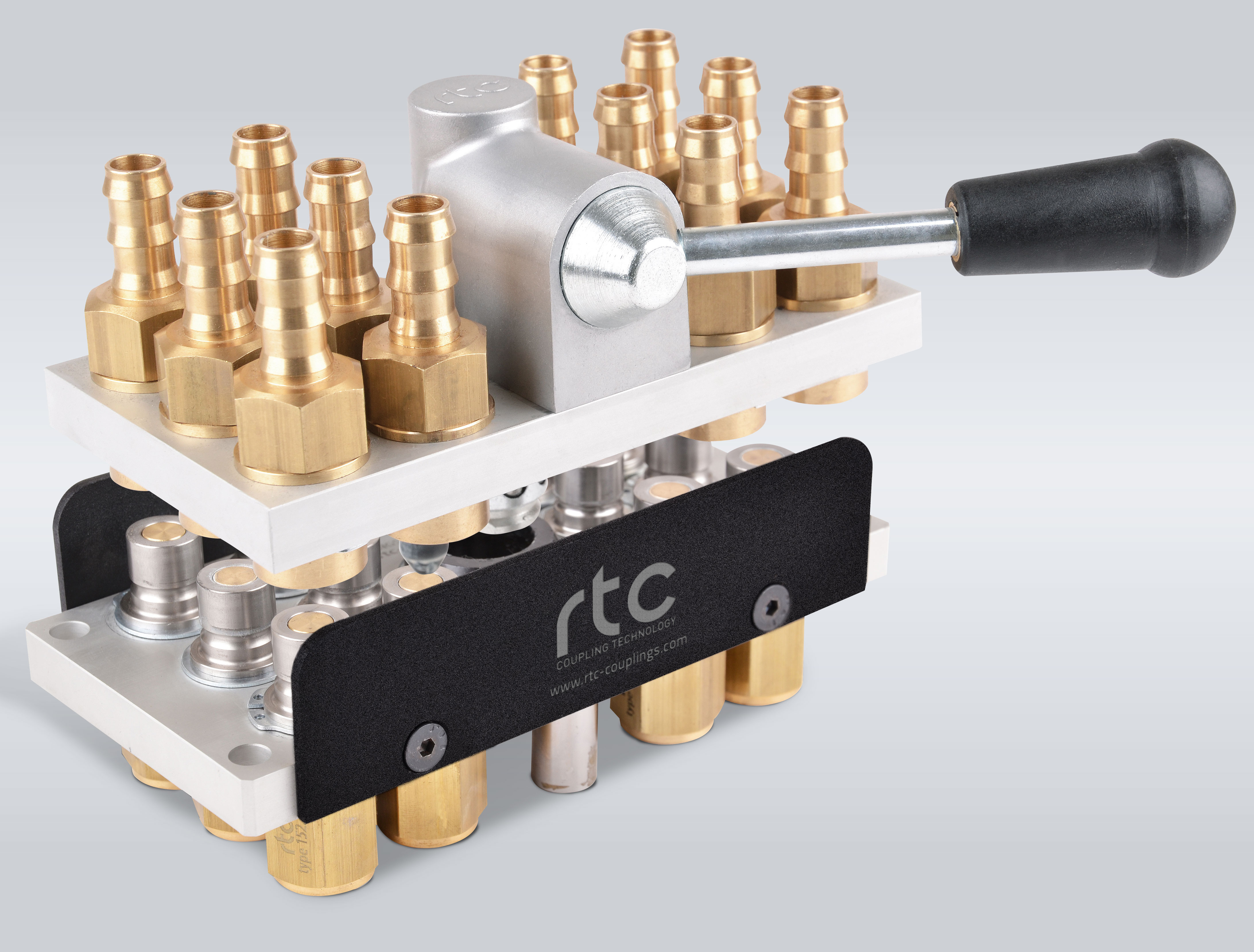
At the top of the picture there are a dozen hose barbs (brass).

Hose barbs are cylindrical pieces or parts for attaching and securing hoses. The barb-like rings on the cylindrical piece allow for an easy push-connection of flexible plastic or rubber tubing that is not easily disconnected. Hose barbs are used in machine perfusion and chemistry laboratory equipment. Hose barb fittings are small curved, bent or T-shaped pipes, hoses or tubes with hose barbs on at least one side used to join two or more pieces of piping (hosing, tubing) together. Hose barbs are commonly used in the agriculture industry to connect anhydrous ammonia (NH_{3}) hoses.

== See also ==
- Hose coupling
- Piping and plumbing fitting
