= Otto Schott =

German chemist, glass technologist, and inventor (1851–1935)

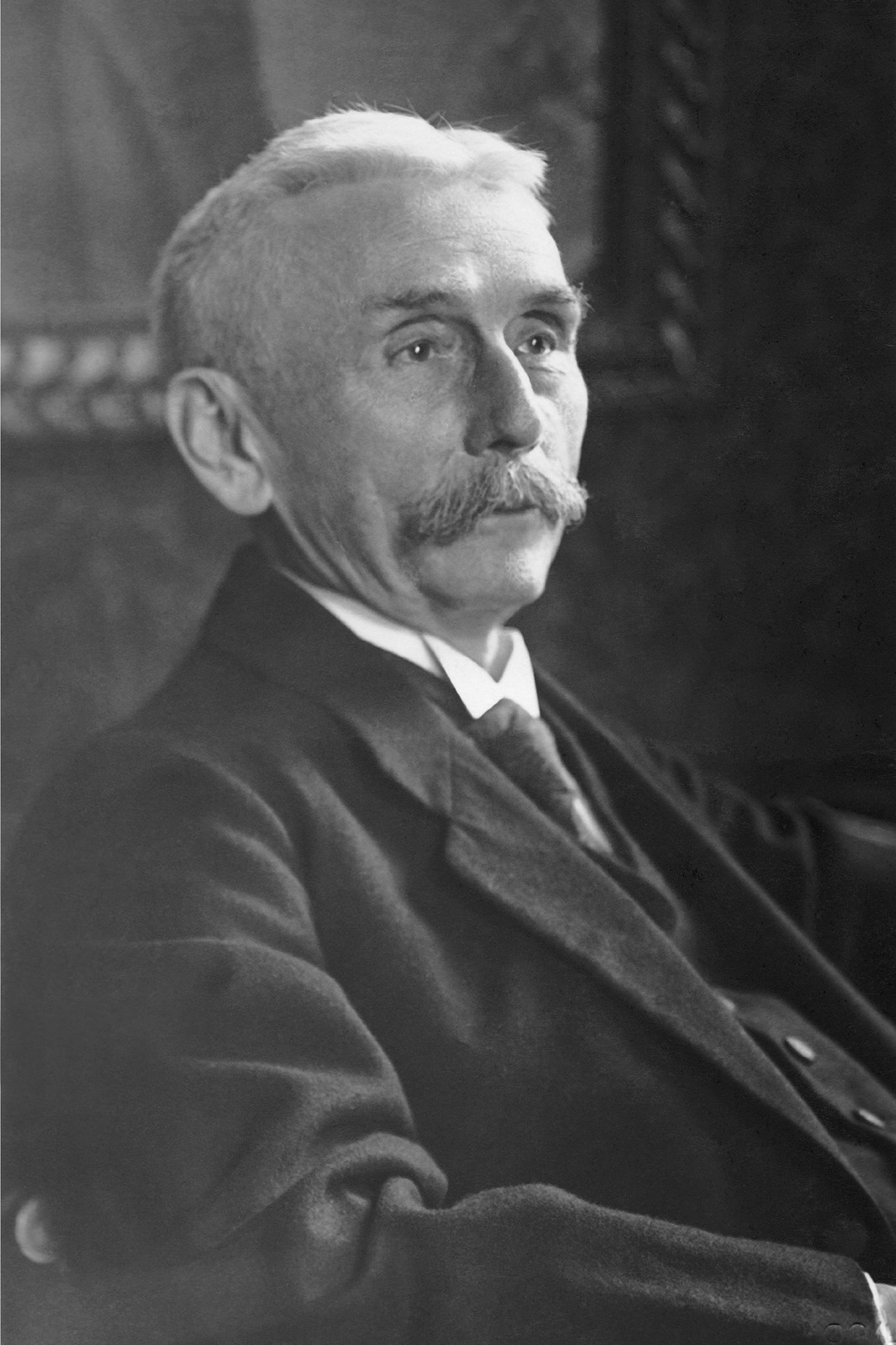
- Born: 17 December 1851; Witten, Germany
- Died: 27 August 1935 (aged 83); Jena, Germany
- Education: Friedrich Schiller University Jena
- Known for: Systematic investigation of glass composition and properties Invention of borosilicate glass
- Awards: Liebig Medal (1909)
- Scientific career
- Fields: Glass science
- Workplaces: Friedrich Schiller University Jena; Schott AG

Friedrich Otto Schott (1851–1935) was a German chemist, glass technologist, and the inventor of borosilicate glass. Schott systematically investigated the relationship between the chemical composition of the glass and its properties. In this way, he solved fundamental problems in glass properties, identifying compositions with optical properties that approach the theoretical limit. Schott's findings were a major advance in the optics for microscopy and optical astronomy. His work has been described as "a watershed in the history of glass composition".

== Early life and education ==
Schott was the son of a window glass maker, Simon Schott. His mother was Karoline Schott. From 1870 to 1873 Schott studied chemical technology at the technical college in Aachen and at the University of Würzburg and at the University of Leipzig. He earned a doctorate in chemistry at Friedrich Schiller University of Jena, specializing in glass science. His doctoral thesis was entitled “Contributions to the Theory and Practice of Glass Fabrication” (1875).

== Scientific contributions ==
In 1879, Schott developed a new lithium-based glass that possessed novel optical properties. Schott shared this discovery with Ernst Abbe, a professor of physics at Jena University whose comments on glass had stimulated Schott's interest in the subject.

I recently produced a glass, in which a considerable amount of lithium was introduced, and the specific gravity of which was relatively low. I suspect that such a glass will exhibit excellent optical properties, and I therefore wanted to inquire whether you or one of your colleagues might be willing to test it for refractive index and dispersion to determine whether my above supposition is correct.

— Translation of letter dated May 27, 1879.

Not long after Schott had completed his formal university training, he had become aware that Abbe had articulated the deficiencies in glass that was available at the time. The deficiencies were particularly acute in scientific instruments for which optical performance of the glass in lenses such as for telescopes and microscopes is paramount. Scientifically, as the magnification power of the lenses were increased, chromatic aberration became large. Chromatic aberration causes the optical quality of the visual image to become dependent on the color of the light, resulting in a significant limitation of the scientific instrument.

In response to Abbe's scientific provocation, Schott began a systematic investigation of the properties of glass as the properties varied with the chemical composition. Schott substituted one element for another, such as borate and phosphate for a portion of the silica in the glass and substituting fluoride for oxygen.

Schott's 1879 letter to Abbe was the beginning of a long collaboration between the two scientists. Abbe was already working with Carl Zeiss, an instrument-maker, on the making of glass for microscopes. Zeiss participated in the three-way collaboration by testing improved glass compositions that Schott and Abbe identified in actual optical instruments, such as telescopes. In 1882, Schott moved to Jena, where he could work more closely with Abbe and Zeiss.

They created types of glass and examined their properties using silica, soda, potash, lime, lead oxide and 28 other elements. Lacking a theoretical basis for the work, they relied on careful and systematic observation and measurement. The addition of elements that had no direct effect on optical properties might help to correct other properties of a glass such as the occurrence of surface staining when exposed to air.

By 1886, Schott had completed thorough investigations of structure-property relationships in glass compositions. Through these investigations, Schott discovered that the refractive index of a glass (important to its ability to function as a magnifying lens) could be disconnected from its chromatic aberration. In this way, Schott settled on a lithium-containing glass that could perform close to its theoretical limit in scientific instruments, which was a significant advance in optical instrumentation such as for microscopy and astronomy.

By mastering the process of small-scale melt-stirring, Schott was able to create a homogeneous product, whose refractive index and dispersion could be exactly measured and characterized. Through systematic experiment, he applied this to the creation of an array of different glass types. Based on his experiments, Schott worked with A. Winkelmann to develop the first composition-property model for the calculation of glass properties.

=== Glass compositions ===
Schott systematized the chemical composition of a significant range of glass compositions. Representative examples are summarized in the table.

Table showing examples of glass compositions identified by Otto Schott:
Glass	SiO_{2}	B_{2}O_{3}	Na_{2}O	CaO	MgO	Al_{2}O_{3}
1:1:6 soda-lime-silica glass (reference composition, not first identified by Schott, contains other oxides)	75.3%	0%	13.0%	0%	11.7%	0%
Jena Standard Glass	67.2%	2.0%	14.0%	7.0%	0%	2.5%
Schott Thermometer Glass	72.0%	12.0%	11.0%	0%	0%	5.0%
Schott Utensil Glass	73.7%	6.2%	6.6%	0%	5.5%	3.3%
Schott Welsbach Chimney Glass	75.8%	15.2%	4.0%	0%	0%	0%

== Business interests ==
Schott Duran glass logo

In 1884, in association with Ernst Abbe and Carl Zeiss, Otto founded Glastechnische Laboratorium Schott & Genossen (Schott & Associates Glass Technology Laboratory) in Jena. It was here, during the period 1887 through to 1893, that Schott developed borosilicate glass. Borosilicate glass is distinguished for its high tolerance to heat and a substantial resistance to thermal shock resulting from sudden temperature changes and resistance to degradation when exposed to corrosive chemicals. This type of glass initially became known under the brand name Duran. Their business enterprise also commercialized apochromatic lenses that had low chromatic aberration and was based on Schott's systematic investigations of the composition and properties of glass.

Schott used borosilicate glass to make laboratory and medical supplies, including thermometers, glassware for laboratory use, medicine vials and pharmaceutical tubing. Schott produced domestic glassware under the brandname "Jenaer Glas". He also produced heat resistant lamp cylinders for use in gas lighting. Carl Auer's incandescent gas lamps were first sold in 1894 and became a lucrative source of income for Schott's glassworks. In late 1890s he was also involved in the electrification of the industry in Jena. Schott's business enterprise held a near monopoly on global optical glass from its inception until the start of World War I.

In 1919, Schott & Associates became wholly owned by the Carl Zeiss Foundation, although Schott & Associates is known in the early 21st century as Schott AG. The Schott Company's brand became associated with high quality and specialty optics.

== Personal life ==
In 1917, Otto Schott's eldest son, Rolf Schott, was killed in World War I. Shortly thereafter, Otto's son Erich Schott joined Schott & Gen. In 1926, Otto Schott retired from active work at Schott & Gen. Shortly thereafter, Erich Schott took over Otto Schott's responsibilities in managing the company.

== Awards and legacy ==
In 1909, Schott received the Liebig Medal from the Association of German Chemists. Otto-Schott-Straße in Jena, Germany, the location of Schott's home, was renamed in Schott's honor. The Schott Glass Museum is on the same premises. Both can be visited. The Schott Glass Museum displays developments in glass science beginning with the innovations of Otto Schott.

Since 1991, the Otto Schott Research Award has been presented every two years to meritorious researchers in the field of glass science and ceramics science. The award is organized and funded by the Abbe Fund of the Carl Zeiss Foundation.
