= Grand Duchy of Hesse =

State in western Germany (1806–1918)

Grand Duchy of Hesse and by Rhine Großherzogtum Hessen und bei Rhein (German)
- 1806–1918
- Flag Coat of arms
- Motto: Gott, Ehre, Vaterland God, Honour, Fatherland
- Anthem: Hessenlied "Song of Hesse"

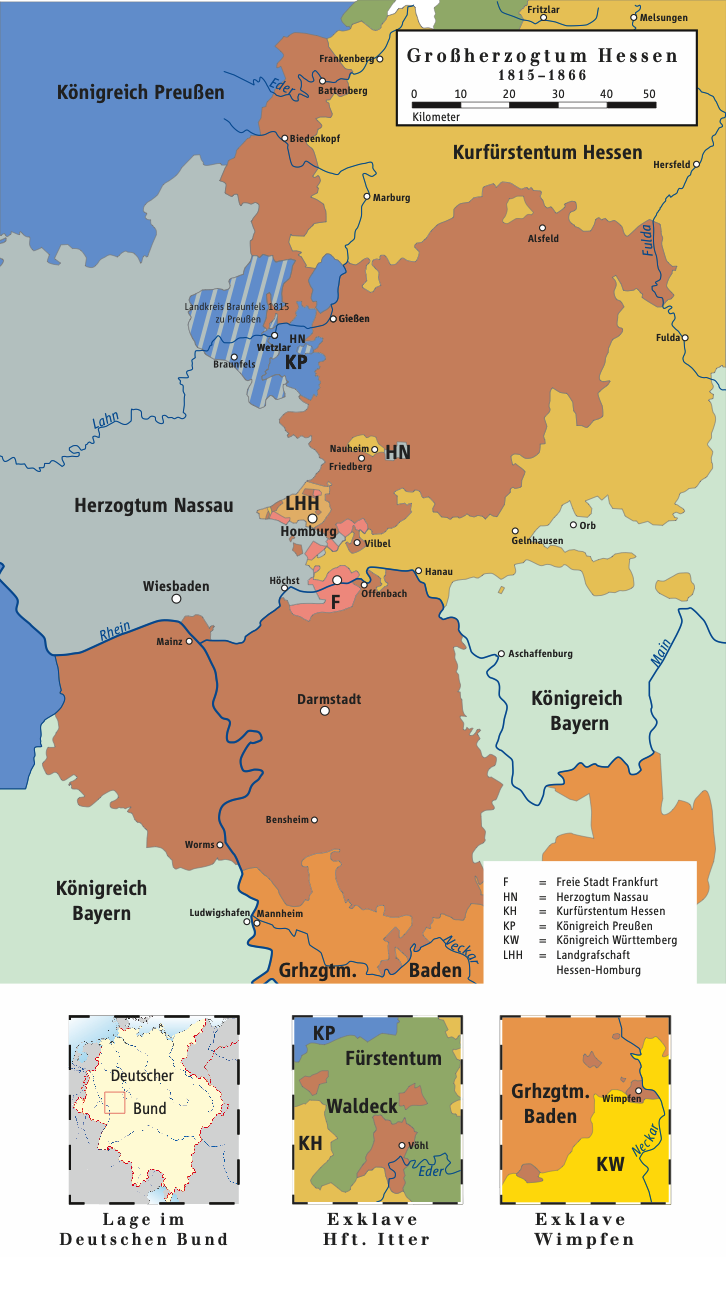
- Grand Duchy of Hesse (1815–1866)
- Status: State of the Confederation of the Rhine (1806–1813); State of the German Confederation (1815–48); State of the German Empire (1848–49); Independent state (1849–1850); State of the German Confederation (1850–66); State of the North German Confederation (1867–71); Federal State of the German Empire (1871–1918)
- Capital: Darmstadt
- Common languages: Hessian German
- Religion: Protestantism; Catholicism
- Government: Constitutional Monarchy
- Grand Duke
  - 1806–1830 (first): Louis I
  - 1892–1918 (last): Ernest Louis
- Minister-President
  - 1821–1829 (first): Carl Grolman
  - 1906–1918 (last): Christian Ewald
- Legislature: Landstände
- Historical era: Napoleonic Wars; WWI
  - Established: 13 August 1806
  - German Revolution: 9 November 1918

Area
- 1806: 9,300 km^{2} (3,600 sq mi)
- 1815: 8,345 km^{2} (3,222 sq mi)
- 1866: 7,682 km^{2} (2,966 sq mi)
- 1910: 7,688.36 km^{2} (2,968.49 sq mi)

Population
  - 1806: 546,000
  - 1889: 968,000
  - 1910: 1,282,051
Preceded by	Succeeded by
Landgraviate of Hesse-Darmstadt; Holy Roman Empire	People's State of Hesse

The Grand Duchy of Hesse and by Rhine (German: Großherzogtum Hessen und bei Rhein) was a grand duchy in western Germany that existed from 1806 to 1918. The grand duchy originally formed from the Landgraviate of Hesse-Darmstadt in 1806 as the Grand Duchy of Hesse (German: Großherzogtum Hessen). It assumed the name Hesse and by Rhine in 1816 to distinguish itself from the Electorate of Hesse, which had formed from the neighbouring Landgraviate of Hesse-Kassel. Colloquially, the grand duchy continued to be known by its former name of Hesse-Darmstadt.

In 1806, the Landgraviate of Hesse-Darmstadt seceded from the Holy Roman Empire and joined Napoleon's new Confederation of the Rhine. The country was promoted to the status of grand duchy and received considerable new territories, principally the Duchy of Westphalia. After the French defeat in 1815, the grand duchy joined the new German Confederation. Westphalia was taken by Prussia, but Hesse received Rhenish Hesse in return. A constitution was proclaimed in 1820 and a long process of legal reforms was begun, with the aim of unifying the disparate territories under the grand duke's control. The political history of the grand duchy during this period was characterised by conflict between the conservative mediatised houses (Standesherren) and forces supporting political and social liberalisation. During the 1848 revolutions, the government was forced to grant wide-ranging reforms, including the full abolition of serfdom and universal manhood suffrage, but the reactionary government of Reinhard von Dalwigick rolled most of these back over the following decade. In 1866, Hesse entered the Austro-Prussian War on the Austrian side, but received a relatively mild settlement from the Prussian victors. The grand duchy joined the German Empire in 1871. As a small state within the empire, the grand duchy had limits placed on its autonomy, but significant religious, social, and cultural reforms were carried out. During the November Revolution after World War I in 1918, the grand duchy was overthrown and replaced by the People's State of Hesse.

== Geography ==
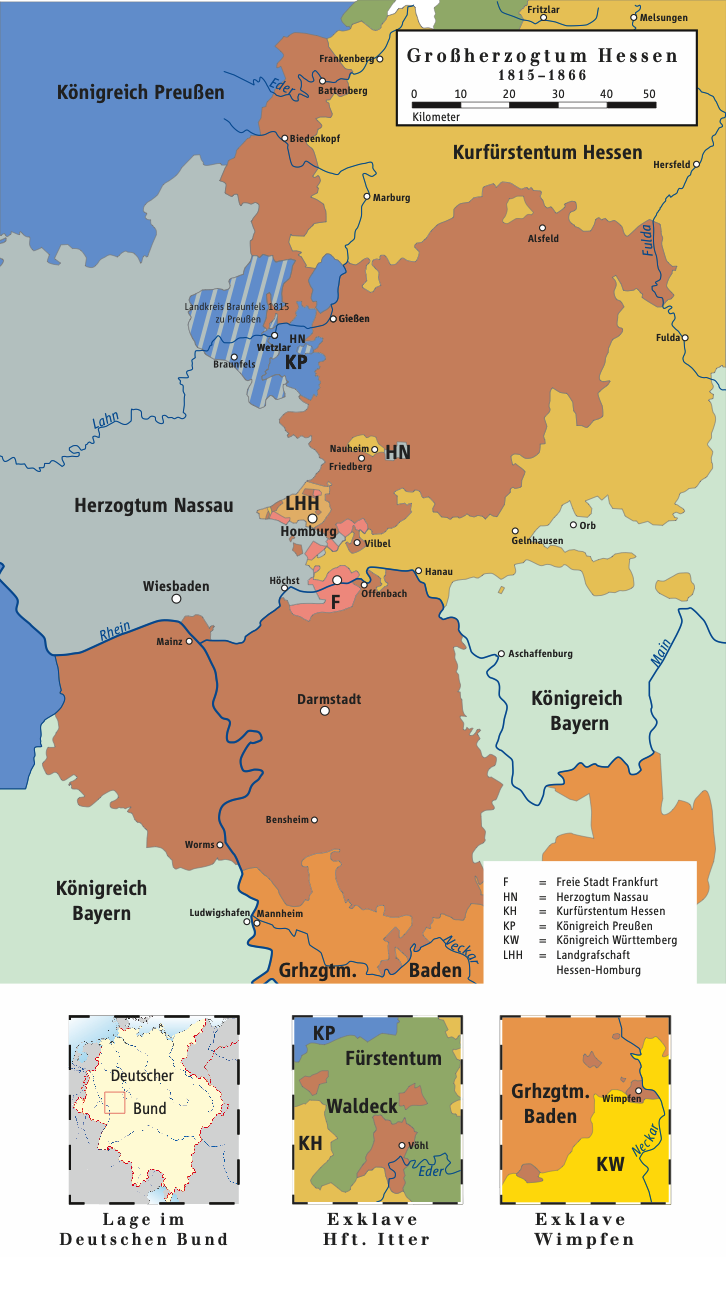
Territory of the Grand Duchy of Hesse, 1815–1866

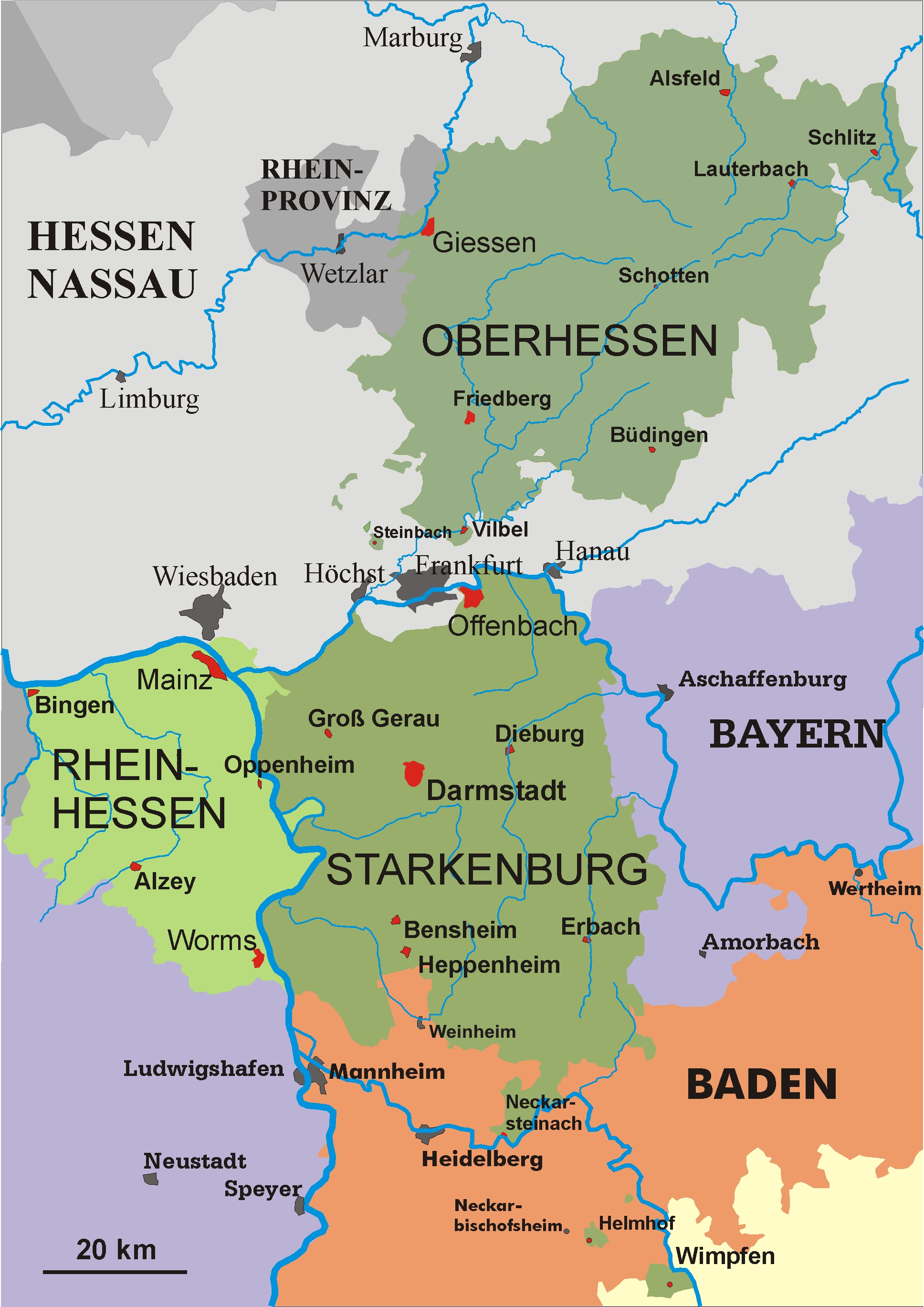
Territory of the Grand Duchy of Hesse from 1866, with its three provinces: Upper Hesse, Starkenburg, and Rhenish Hesse

The portion of the grand duchy on the right bank of the Rhine stretched most of the way from the south of the modern state of Hesse to Frankenberg. The portion on the left bank was located in the modern state of Rhineland-Palatinate. In addition to the great floodplains of the Rhine (Hessian Ried), Main, and Wetterau, the grand duchy also contained upland regions like the Vogelsberg, the Hessian Hinterland, and the Odenwald. In the south, the exclaves of the Wimpfen district extended into the Grand Duchy of Baden.

=== Physical geography and population ===
The territory consisted of two separate areas: the province of Upper Hesse in the north and the provinces of Starkenburg and Rhenish Hesse in the south, as well as a number of much smaller exclaves. The northern and southern sections were separated by a narrow stretch of territory, which belonged to Prussia after 1866 and before that to Duchy of Nassau, the Free City of Frankfurt, and the Electorate of Hesse. About 25% of the land area was forested. The two sections had very different characters:

Upper Hesse

Upper Hesse was the largest of the three provinces by area. Most of this territory was forested uplands of the Vogelsberg and the Hessian Hinterland. Only a small portion was part of the fertile Wetterau, where there were also brown coal deposits. There were many streams and waterways in the area, but none of them were big enough to serve as transport routes. Agriculture brought only low yields, while there was no industry at all. This led to increasing poverty over the course of the 19th century and massive emigration to the established industrial centres in Germany and overseas. While Upper Hesse was also the largest province by population at the start of the 19th century, by the end of the grand duchy in 1918 it had become the smallest. The only significant institution which was based here was the University of Giessen.

Starkenburg and Rhenish Hesse

Starkenburg and Rhenish Hesse were totally different. They lay almost entirely on the banks of the Rhine (except for the Odenwald, which faced similar structural problems to the Vogelsberg). Intensive agriculture was possible and profitable in many areas of these plains, such as fruit growing on the Bergstraße and viticulture in Rhine-Hesse. There were two large navigable rivers, the Rhine and the Main, which were the most important transportation routes until the development of the railway. Burgeoning industry developed in this region. The three major centres of the grand duchy were located here: the capital at Darmstadt, the largest industrial centre at Offenbach am Main, and Mainz which was the largest city and the most significant centre for trade.

=== Political geography ===
The grand duchy was divided into three provinces:

- Starkenburg (capital at Darmstadt): Right bank of the Rhine, south of the Main.
- Rhenish Hesse (capital at Mainz): Left bank of the Rhine, territory gained from the Congress of Vienna.
- Upper Hesse (capital at Giessen): North of the Main, separated from Starkenburg by the Free City of Frankfurt.

The neighbouring states were:

- The Prussian Rhine Province, the Duchy of Nassau (part of Prussia after 1866), and the Prussian Province of Westphalia to the west;
- The Electorate of Hesse (also part of Prussia from 1866) to the north and northeast;
- The Kingdom of Bavaria to the east;
- The Grand Duchy of Baden to the south;
- Kürnbach was governed as a condominium with Baden until 1905;
- The Bavarian province of Palatinate to the southwest;
- The two main regions of the grand duchy were separated by the Free City of Frankfurt and the Electorate of Hesse (parts of Prussia after 1866)
- The long northern region of Biedenkopf district and the Hessian Hinterland was linked to the rest of Upper Hesse by a corridor of land only 500 metres wide at Heuchelheim, which was surrounded on both sides by Wetzler district, an exclave of the Prussian Rhine Province.

There were also a number of Hessian exclaves to the north and south:

- The exclave of Vöhl district was sandwiched between the Electorate of Hesse and the Principality of Waldeck and Pyrmont, while Eimelrod und Höringhausen were inside Waldeck;
- The exclave of Wimpfen was sandwiched between Baden and the Kingdom of Württemberg;
- Another exclave, made up of half the town of Helmhof, was located inside Baden;

Amt Dorheim, which belonged to the Electorate of Hesse, was an enclave within the grand duchy until 1866, when it was given to the grand duchy.

Hesse-Homburg was inherited by the Grand Duke of Hesse in 1866, but had to be ceded to Prussia later that same year. The Biedenkopf district and the Hessian Hinterland were also annexed by Prussia in 1866. These territories were combined with Electoral Hesse, the Duchy of Nassau, and Frankfurt to create the new Prussian Province of Hesse-Nassau in 1868.

== History ==
=== 1806 establishment ===
Coat of arms of the Grand Duchy, 1806–1808

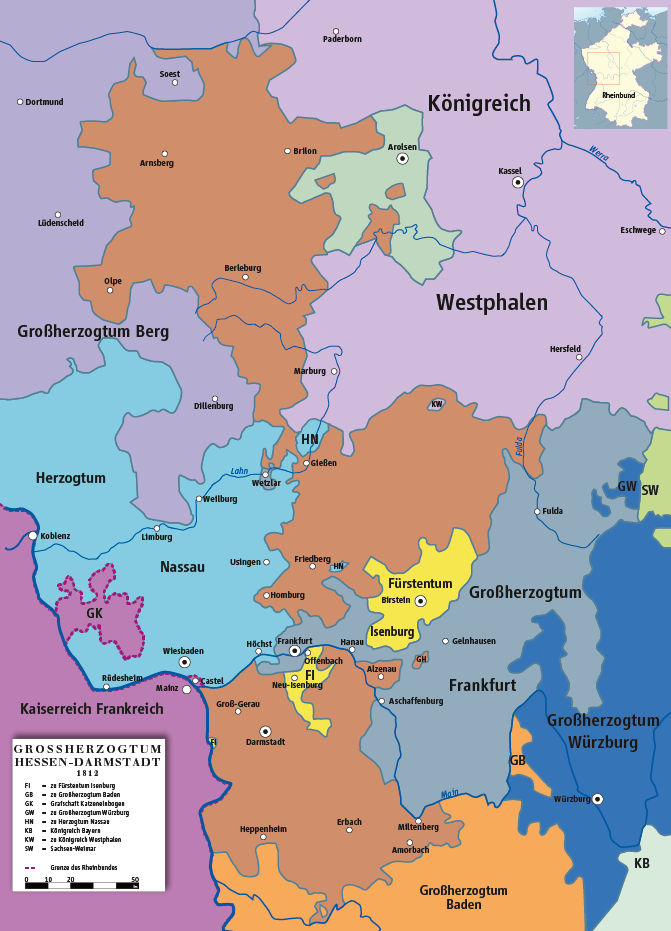
Grand Duchy of Hesse in 1812

During the Napoleonic Wars, Louis X, Landgrave of Hesse-Darmstadt, initially sought Prussian protection against Napoleonic France, but after the Battle of Austerlitz, this policy became untenable. At the last minute, Louis X switched sides and supplied troops to Napoleon. Along with fifteen other states, the Landgraviate of Hesse-Darmstadt left the Holy Roman Empire and joined the Confederation of the Rhine. The Landgraviate of Hesse-Darmstadt was promoted to a grand duchy and Louis X thereafter styled himself Grand Duke Louis I (German: Großherzog Ludewig I., with an extra 'e') and announced not only the promotion, but also the territories he had received under the Treaty of the Confederation of the Rhine in an edict on 13 August 1806. Along with the promotion to the rank of grand duchy, Hesse was also rewarded with territorial gains, such as the Electorate of Cologne. However, although all this territory lay under his sovereignty, the princes who had previously held these territories, the mediatised houses, retained a significant portion of their former powers.

Before this territorial expansion, the Landgraviate of Hesse-Darmstadt had around 210,000 inhabitants in its territories on the right bank of the Rhine. After 1806, the population was around 546,000. At the same time, the Grand Duchy reached its greatest territorial extent, around 9,300 km^{2}. Almost simultaneously, there was a radical change in the state's internal politics. With two edicts on 1 October 1806, the Grand Duke revoked the financial privileges of the landed nobility on a large scale (the landed nobility became subject to taxation (Note: The mediatised houses were more fortunate, since they were granted a 1/3 tax deduction owing to the privileged status awarded to them in the Treaty of the Confederation of the Rhine (Franz/Fleck/Kallenberg: Großherzogtum Hessen, pp. 709 f.))) and their Landstände (feudal estates) were abolished, which transformed Hesse-Darmstadt "from a mosaic of patrimonial fragments into a centralized, absolute monarchy".

=== Developments after 1806 ===
On 24 April 1809, Napoleon ordered the abolition of the Teutonic Order, amalgamating Kloppenheim and Schiffenberg Abbey into the grand duchy.

Between 1808 and 1810, there were plans to introduce the Napoleonic Code as only valid law for the whole grand duchy. However, these discussions were terminated by the conservative government of Friedrich August von Lichtenberg, which was opposed to social changes.

On 11 May 1810, the grand duchy and the French Empire concluded a treaty, which granted the grand duchy further areas under French control, which had been taken from Electoral Hesse in 1806. Although the treaty was agreed in May, it was only signed by Napoleon on 17 October 1810. The Hessian certificate of possession is dated 10 November 1810. The Babenhausen district was attached to Strakenburg province, the other territories to Upper Hesse.

In August 1810, there was a three-way agreement between France, Hesse, and the Grand Duchy of Baden. Baden placed its territories at French disposal and France gave them back to the grand duchy with a treaty signed on 11 November 1810. The Hessian certificate of possession is dated 13 November 1810.

=== The Congress of Vienna (1815) ===
At the Congress of Vienna in 1815, the grand duchy joined the German Confederation and received a portion of the former Mont-Tonnerre department, which had a population of 140,000 people and included the important federal Fortress of Mainz, as compensation for the Duchy of Westphalia, which Hesse had received in 1803 and which was now transferred to Prussia. During the turbulence of Hundred Days, when Napoleon returned from exile, Austria, Prussia, and the Grand Duchy of Hesse concluded a treaty on 30 June 1816, which regulated the region and went into more detail that the treaty signed at Vienna in the previous year. There were further border agreements and exchanges of small areas of territory with the Electorate of Hesse and the Kingdom of Bavaria. The patents of possession are dated 8 July 1816, but were only published on 11 July. After this consolidation, the grand duchy had a population of roughly 630,000.

The neighbouring Landgraviate of Hesse-Kassel, which Napoleon had annexed into the Kingdom of Westphalia, was re-established by the Congress of Vienna as the Electorate of Hesse. After Louis I's counterpart in Hesse-Kessel, William I, Elector of Hesse, began styling himself "Elector of Hesse and Grand Duke of Fulda", Louis sought the additional title "Elector of Mainz and Duke of Worms" in order to match William I. However, Austria and Prussia refused to grant this. Instead, William gestured to this claimed title by changing the name of the grand duchy to the Grand Duchy of Hesse and by Rhine (German: Großherzogtum Hessen und bei Rhein), which also helped to distinguish the two Hessian states.

=== The Constitution of 1820 and legal reforms ===
==== Constitution ====
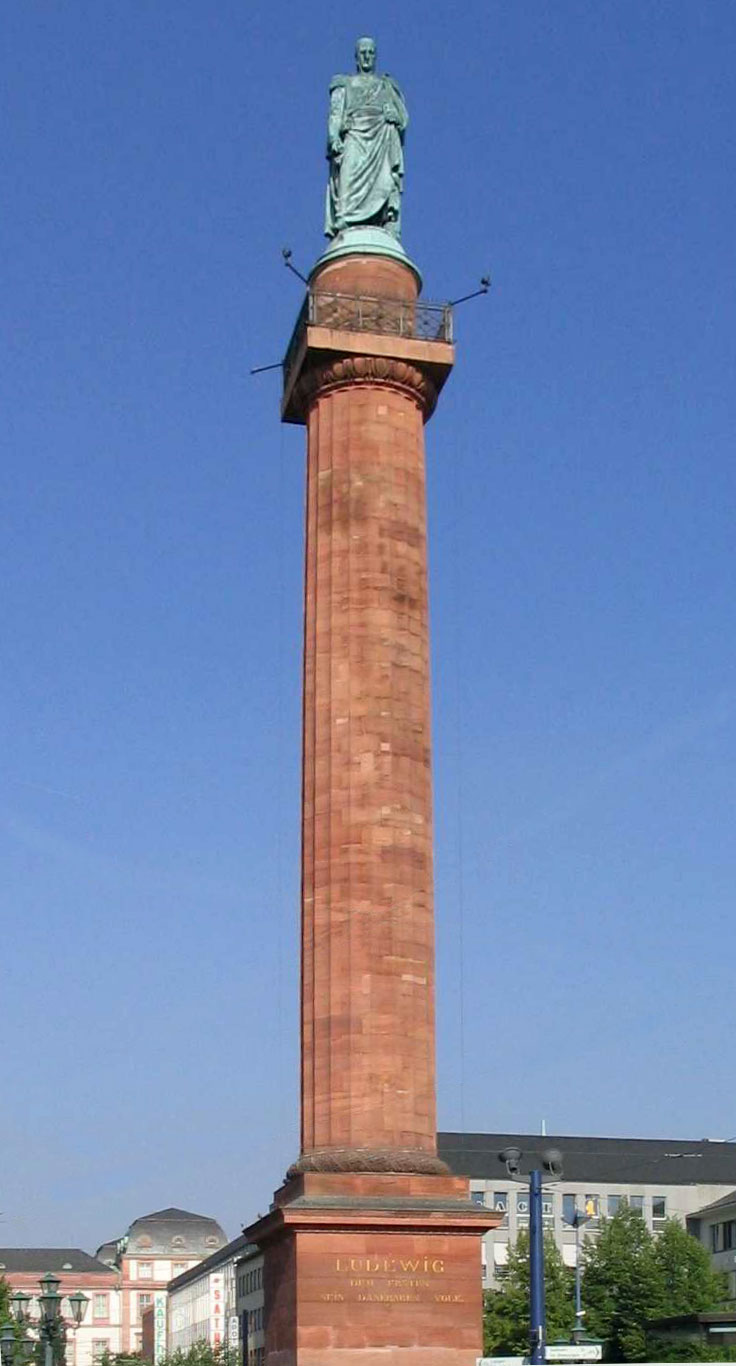
Louis I depicted with Hessian Constitution in his right hand on the Ludwigsmonument in Darmstadt

As a result of these territorial acquisitions, the grand duchy was composed of numerous disparate components. A constitution was therefore urgently needed in order to unite the various territories of the new state. Furthermore, article 13 of the Constitution of the German Confederation required each member state to establish their own "parliamentary constitution" (Landständische Verfassung). Louis I balked at this and was quoted as saying that a parliament "in a sovereign state [is] not necessary, not useful, and in some respects dangerous." In fact, the process of constitutional reform was mainly undertaken by the civil service rather than the grand duke himself. The members of the civil service who led the reforms were:

- August Friedrich Wilhelm Crome (1753–1833)
- Karl Christian Eigenbrodt (1769–1839)
- Claus Kröncke (1771–1843)
- Ludwig Minnigerode (1773–1839)
- Heinrich Karl Jaup (1781–1860)
- Peter Joseph Floret (1776–1836)

In 1816, a three-man legal commission was established to craft a constitution and other necessary laws, composed of Floret and Carl Ludwig Wilhelm Grolman.

The constitution which was promulgated by grand ducal edict in March 1820 provided for a parliament (Landstände), but with no authority of its own. Although this led to the first elections in the grand duchy, it also caused massive protests, tax strikes, and even armed rebellions against the government in some parts of the grand duchy. The grand duke and his administration gave in to the pressure and a new constitution was promulgated on 17 December 1820. The new constitution contained most of what the opponents of the first constitution had wanted, but the grand duke saved face since the constitution was formally granted by him. Louis I was honoured as a great lawgiver, with the Ludwigsmonument in Darmstadt honouring him for "his" constitution.

The constitution was followed by a wide range of further reforms in the grand duchy.

==== Legal and administrative reforms ====
After its territorial augmentation, the grand duchy consisted of numerous territories with different administrative systems. To regularise this, it was urgently necessary to integrate the various regions. At the lower levels, the administrative system of these regions was still based on the Amt system which had become obsolete centuries earlier. As well as being the lowest level administrative subdivision, the Ämter were also the courts of first instance. Preliminary work on reforming this system began by 1816, and from 1821, the court system and the administrative system were separated at the lowest level in Starkenburg and Upper Hesse provinces. In Rheinhessen, this had already been done around twenty years earlier, while the area was under French control.

The tasks that had previously been assigned to the Ämter were transferred to Landratsbezirke ("local council districts", responsible for administration) and Landgerichten ("local courts", responsible for judicial functions). (Note: In Darmstadt and Gießen the equivalents of the Landgerichten were called "Stadtgericht" ("city courts").) This process took place over several years, since at first the state could make new rules about administration and justice only where it had unrestricted authority over these matters. The areas in which the grand duchy's sovereignty was unrestricted were called Dominiallande, while the areas where the Standesherren and other nobles exercised their own judicial and administrative authority were the Souveränitätslanden. In the latter areas, the state first had to forge agreements with the individual lords, in order to integrate their judicial powers into the state's court system. In some cases this took until the middle of the 1820s. The "Edict concerning Standesherren's Legal Relationships in the Grand Duchy of Hesse" of 27 March 1820 served as the frame of reference for these agreements. According to this edict, the individual Standesherren retained their personnel sovereignty in the Landratsbezirke and Landgerichten established in the Souveränitätslanden, which meant that the Standesherren chose the local councillors and judges. This remaining power was only removed during the German revolutions of 1848–1849.

From the 50+ Ämter that had previously existed 24 Landratsbezirke and 27 Landgerichten were created. The new Landgerichte had their own judicial districts, which covered almost the same areas as the Landratsbezirke did. In general, the old seats of the Amtsmen remained either the seat of the Landrat or the Landgericht. Five further Landratsbezirke and six more Landgerichten were created over the following years as a result of the negotiations with the Standesherren. (Note: The Landgericht Schönberg however only existed in the period 1822–1826.)

==== Civic administration ====
A modern system of civic administration, modelled on the French system, was also introduced in 1821. The outmoded cooperative parish associations were replaced by a system of civic and parish citizenship.

Bürgermeister (mayors) were established for individual settlements and parish associations with at least 400 inhabitants. In 1831 there were 1092 parishes in the grand duchy, administered by 732 mayors.

The mayoralties were administered by an elected local board, consisting of the mayor, deputies, and parish councillors. Male residents elected three men and one of them was chosen as mayor:

- In the Dominialland, this decision was made by the state.
- In the Souveränitätslanden, the Standesherren chose them.

This system ensured that, if the authorities did not like a particular candidate, they could prevent them from taking office. Thus, for example, the entrepreneur Ernst Emil Hoffmann received the most votes in Darmstadt two times, but the mayoralty was assigned to the second or third place candidates.

In Upper Hesse and Starkenburg, the local council had oversight of the mayors, while in Rhinehessen, where this local district did not exist, the mayors were chosen directly by the provincial governments.

==== Abolition of serfdom ====
The state was also interested in replacing the old agricultural ground rent, which was often based on the yield of the year's harvest, with a modern system of taxation. There had been plans for this since 1816. A first step in the process was also implemented during the reforms of 1821. However, this was only a limited reform, since only the ground rents paid to the state were removable. The removal of "private" ground rents, including those paid to churches, religious orders, and Standesherren, failed to pass the first chamber of the parliament. Furthermore, in order to remove the ground rent from their land, farmers were initially required to pay a fee which was eighteen times their annual rent and most farmers could not afford this. The process of abolition would drag on into the second half of the 19th century.

==== Economic reforms ====
The constitution declared that an economic system based on liberal principles was the state's goal. Achieving economic freedom, which also required the abolition of guild privileges, proved difficult, as a result of "damage to multiple interests". Even in this area, different conditions applied in different parts of the grand duchy. In Rhine-Hesse, the guilds had been abolished during French rule, while in the provinces on the right bank of the Rhine, guild privileges had only been abolished in a few places for a few industries. This abolition was expanded, but guild privileges continued to exist.

=== Impact of the July Revolution (1830–1848) ===
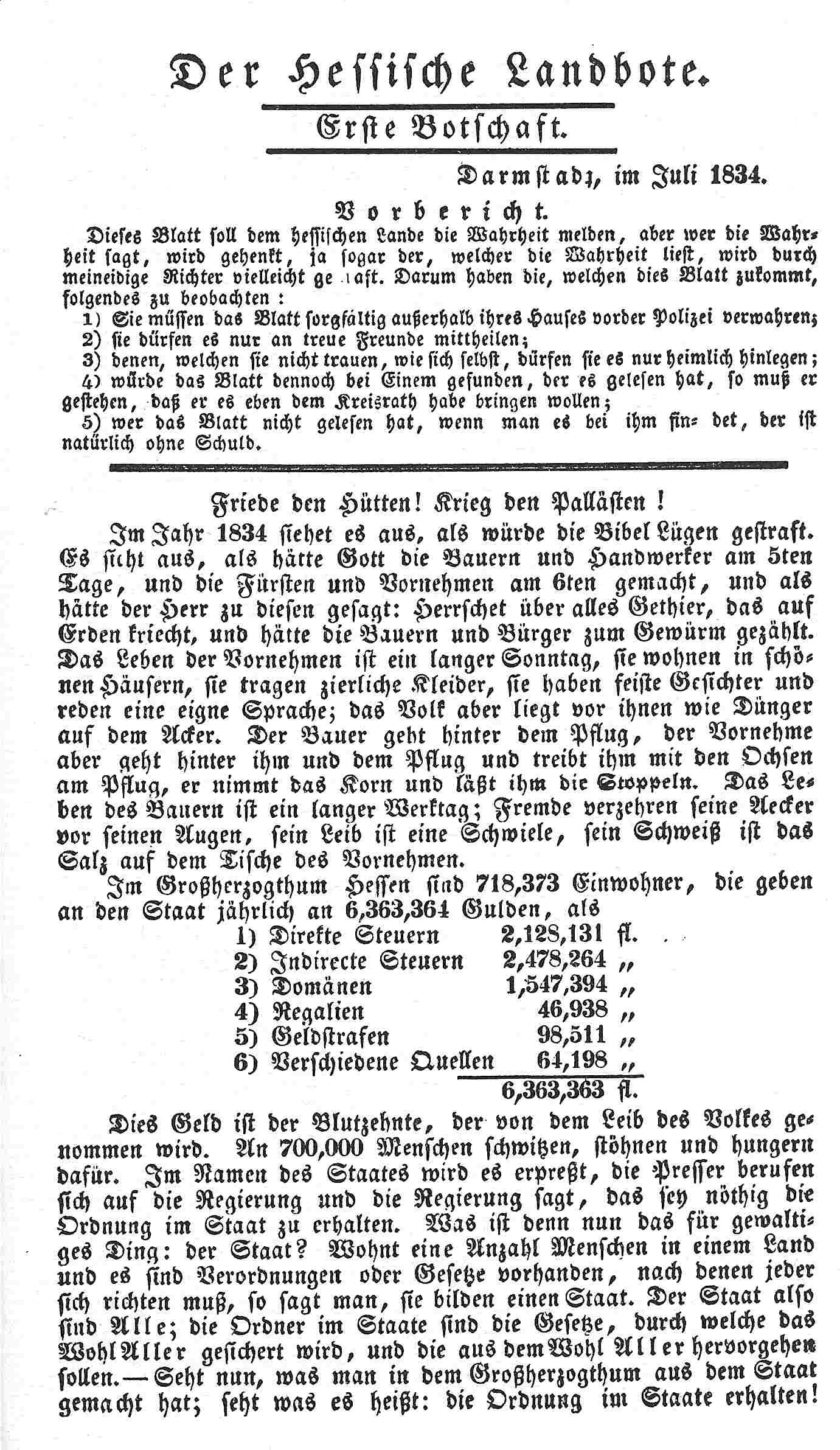
Title page of The Hessian Courier.

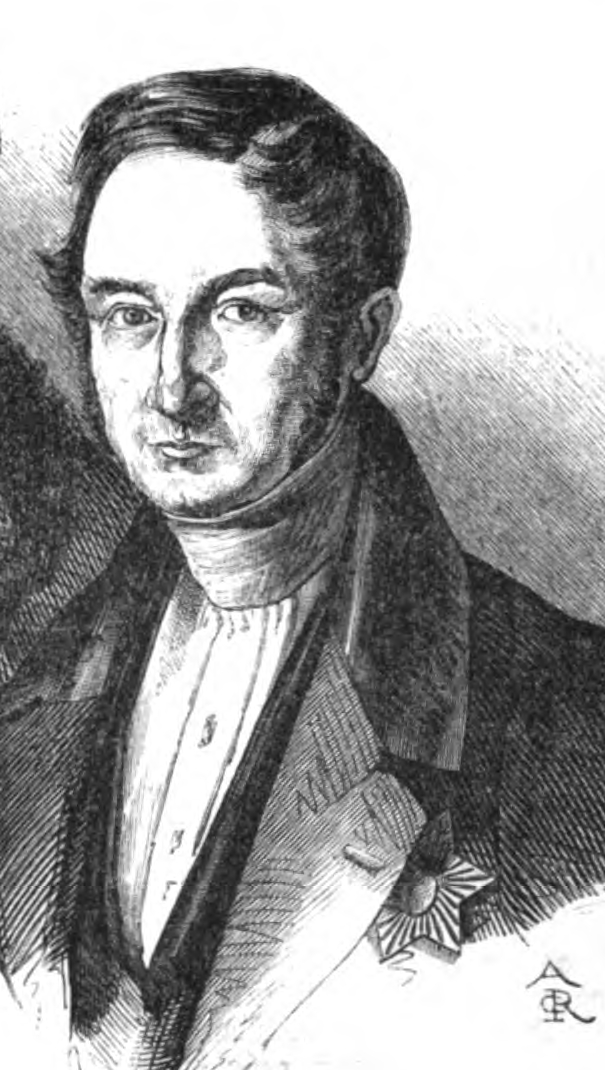
Karl du Thil, President of the Council of Ministers, 1829–1848

The government in Darmstadt only implemented the Karlsbad Decrees in a moderate manner, to the displeasure of the great powers, Prussia and Austria. On the other hand, the government continually persecuted the opposition (although without much long-term success in the courts), since they feared a revolution.

A political crisis was already broiling in Hesse at the time of the July Revolution in 1830: when Louis II succeeded as grand duke after the death of his father in 1830, he had a total debt of two million guilder, which he expected the state to pay for. The liberal opposition in the Landstände considered this outrageous and rejected the proposal with a resounding vote of 41:7.

In Upper Hesse province, a revolt broke out in September 1830, whose members expressed a general dissatisfaction with the state. Characteristically, the territories of the Standesherren were particularly affected: Büdingen and Ortenberg. In these areas, shops were burgled and the local government offices were destroyed. The toll office in Heldenbergen and the Nidda courthouse were also affected. The grand duke introduced summary execution, which was unanimously approved by the Landstände. Under the command of the grand duke's brother, Prince Emil, the rebellion was suppressed by the army. Part of this suppression was the Södel Bloodbath, named for the number of dead and wounded.

After the revolution of 1830 was over, the government regained the upper hand and decided that if they could not suppress the rising appetites for reform, they would at least try to control them. The bourgeoisie partially switched its focus to cultural activities, which the government then began to monitor warily. Thus, the Historical Society for Hesse was allowed to be founded in 1833, but local societies that had originally been planned were not, and the society's charter stated that the society must not occupy itself with "contemporary history and discussion of the political circumstances of more recent times." Above all, sports clubs were considered highly suspicious, even though a demonstration of sporting activities was presented in Darmstadt at the dedication of the Ludwig Monument in 1844.

The government initially maintained its relatively open policy towards the press, but reacted harshly to the distribution of The Hessian Courier, a pamphlet by Georg Büchner calling for social revolution. The persecution of his fellow contributors continued until 1839.

=== The March Revolution (1848–1849) ===
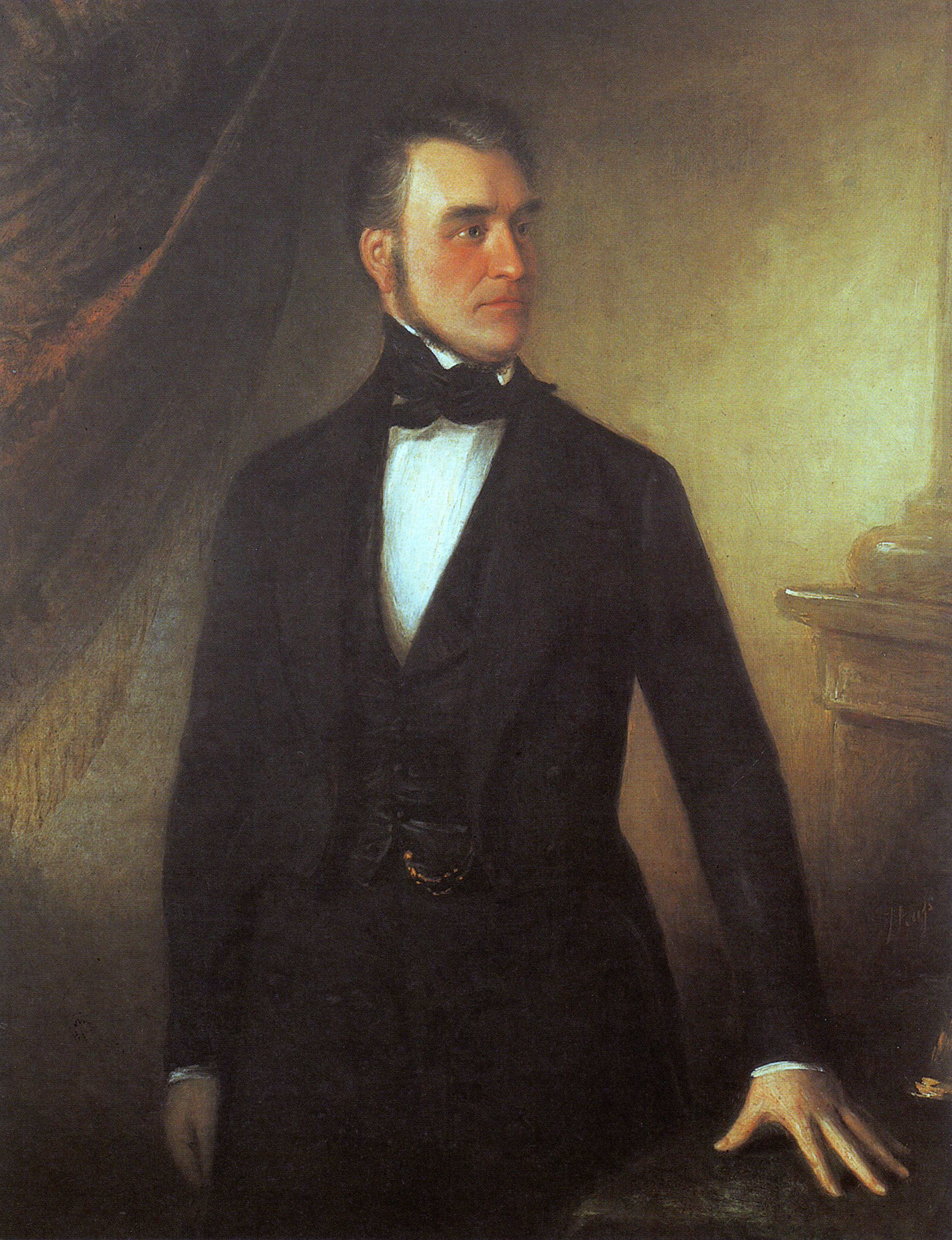
Heinrich von Gagern, chief minister during the Revolution of 1848 (lithograph by Eduard von Heuss)

==== Revolution ====
In the 1840s, Karl du Thil, chief minister from 1821 to 1848, inaugurated the "System du Thil", which entailed the complete suppression of all political discussion. Crop failures and rapidly rising prices for basic foodstuffs created a crisis in the grand duchy. Then on 24 February 1848, a revolution in Paris forced King Louis-Philippe to abdicate. The political tension grew so great that the government no longer waited for citizens' committees and other societies to take banned political actions before persecuting them. Within a few days, the situation had become so dire that, on 5 March 1848, Grand Duke Louis II named his son Louis III as his co-regent (in fact, Louis III became sole ruler, since Louis II was ill and died a few months later on 16 June 1848). The next day, Karl du Thil was dismissed and replaced as chief minister by Heinrich von Gagern. Von Gagern proclaimed that the new government would grant all of the "March demands".

However, the rural population's demands that the Standesherren be stripped of their privileges and for serfdom to be abolished without requiring them to pay compensation were not fulfilled. As a result, on 8 March, a massive demonstration gathered before the residences of the Standesherren and stormed some of them. After this, the Standesherren agreed to the abolition of serfdom without compensation. In doing this, however, the farmers exceeded the limits of what the bourgeoise were willing to accept, since they were not willing to countenance interventions in private property. Von Gagern brought this protest to a close with military force, but accepted the farmers' demands. This marked the end of the "hot phase" of the revolution in the grand duchy, which thus lasted only two weeks.

==== Reforms ====
After March 1848, there was a reshuffle of the ministries, since Heinrich von Gagern was elected president of the Frankfurt Parliament and therefore had to resign from his role as a minister in the grand duchy. Nevertheless, a series of reforms delivered most of the "March demands".

The new organisation of the administration saw the three provinces and all of the districts abolished and replaced by a single level of local administration midway between them, the Regierungsbezirk ("government district"). Each of these had a Bezirksrat (district council) to represent the people.

A reform of the justice system was also carried out in the areas to the right of the Rhine, including the introduction of jury courts.

A new electoral law was not passed until 1849. Under this law, all members of both chambers of the Landstände were now to be elected – the lower house by universal equal suffrage and the upper house by census suffrage. So much "democracy" was novel even for liberal politicians and the interior ministry urged people to act responsibly with their right to vote. Two elections were held under the new electoral system, in 1849 and 1850. Both times, the democrats received a strong majority in the lower chamber, which they used to block the enactment of a state budget.

=== The Dalwigk Era (1850–1866) ===
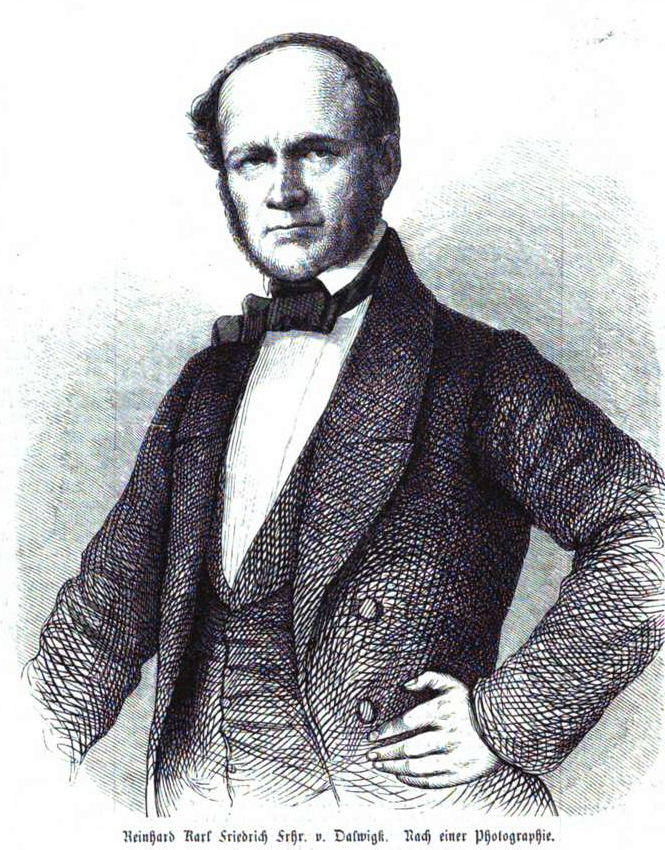
Reinhard von Dalwigk, Minister-President, 1852–1871

Grand Duke Louis III appointed Reinhard von Dalwigk as director of the ministry of the interior on 30 June 1850, transferred him provisionally to the ministry of foreign affairs and the Grand Ducal House on 8 August 1850, and finally named him president of the council of ministers on 25 September 1852. Louis III, who "imitated the image of a paternalistic ruler projected by his grandfather, without achieving his significance," and Dalwigk shared a conservative outlook and were both opposed to liberalism and democracy. For Dalwigk, "the democratic principle [was] perilous for the state, since it necessarily leads to socialism and communism.

==== Internal politics ====
In this role, Dalwigk organised a coup d'état against the Landstände in autumn 1850. On 7 October 1850, he issued an edict setting aside the existing voting system, removing the sitting Landstände from power, and ordering a return to an electoral law like the one that existed before the March Revolution for "extraordinary" elections to the Landstände. These led to the election of the 14th (extraordinary) Landstände, in which pro-government representatives had a majority, and marked the beginning of comprehensive efforts to dismantle the achievements of the revolution. Even after the introduction of limited suffrage in October 1850, the Landstände still had many democratic and liberal members and the crisis regarding the Zollverein in 1852 showed how effective this opposition could still be. However, increased pressure on individual representatives (many of whom gave up and emigrated to the United States) and, especially, the new electoral law of 1856 weakened even this opposition.

==== Zollverein crisis, 1852 ====
In external politics, Dalwigk and Louis III supported Austria, the German Confederation, and a pan-German solution to the German Question.

The first crisis with Prussia arose in 1852 in connection with the Zollverein, the north German customs union dominated by Prussia. In 1851, the Prussians terminated the existing customs treaty from the end of 1853. Austria then attempted to establish a customs union with the German middle states. Dalwigk signed up for this project, against all economic logic, since the grand duchy's exports to Austria were only 3% of its exports to Prussia. Massive protests followed. Even in the Landestände, which was now dominated by pro-Dalwigk conservatives, he found only a minority in favour of this policy. On 14 May 1852, the government went so far as to dissolve the city council of Friedberg with armed police. All of this did not help Dalwigk at all. In the end, Austria and Prussia came to an agreement between themselves on customs and Austria gave up on the idea of a customs union with the German middle states. The whole affair created an enduring enemy to Dalwigk, however: the Prussian representative in the Federal Convention, Otto von Bismarck. He advised the Prussian government to refuse to grant a new customs treaty to the grand duchy, unless Dalwigk resigned. However, this advice was not followed.

==== German National Association ====
The German National Association was founded in 1859. Its goal was to create a liberal Lesser Germany under Prussian leadership – the opposite goal from Dalwigk. He advised the local councils to prosecute all known members of the Association, using the ban on all political associations as justification. After some prominent Hessians, including August Metz, Carl Johann Hoffmann and Emil Pirazzi, were convicted to a symbolic few days imprisonment for this, there was a massive increase in membership of the National Association, which so overwhelmed the prosecutors, that the whole persecution was discontinued in 1861. In summer 1861, the National Association had 937 members in Hesse – the highest number outside Prussia. In 1862, the liberal Hessian Progress Party stood in the Landstände elections and won a landslide victory with 32 of the 50 seats in the lower chamber. Dalwigk's attempt to organise a "Reform Association" to oppose the Progress Party and the National Association was a failure, as was his attempt to get the Federal Convention to ban the National Association.

==== Dynastic reorientation ====
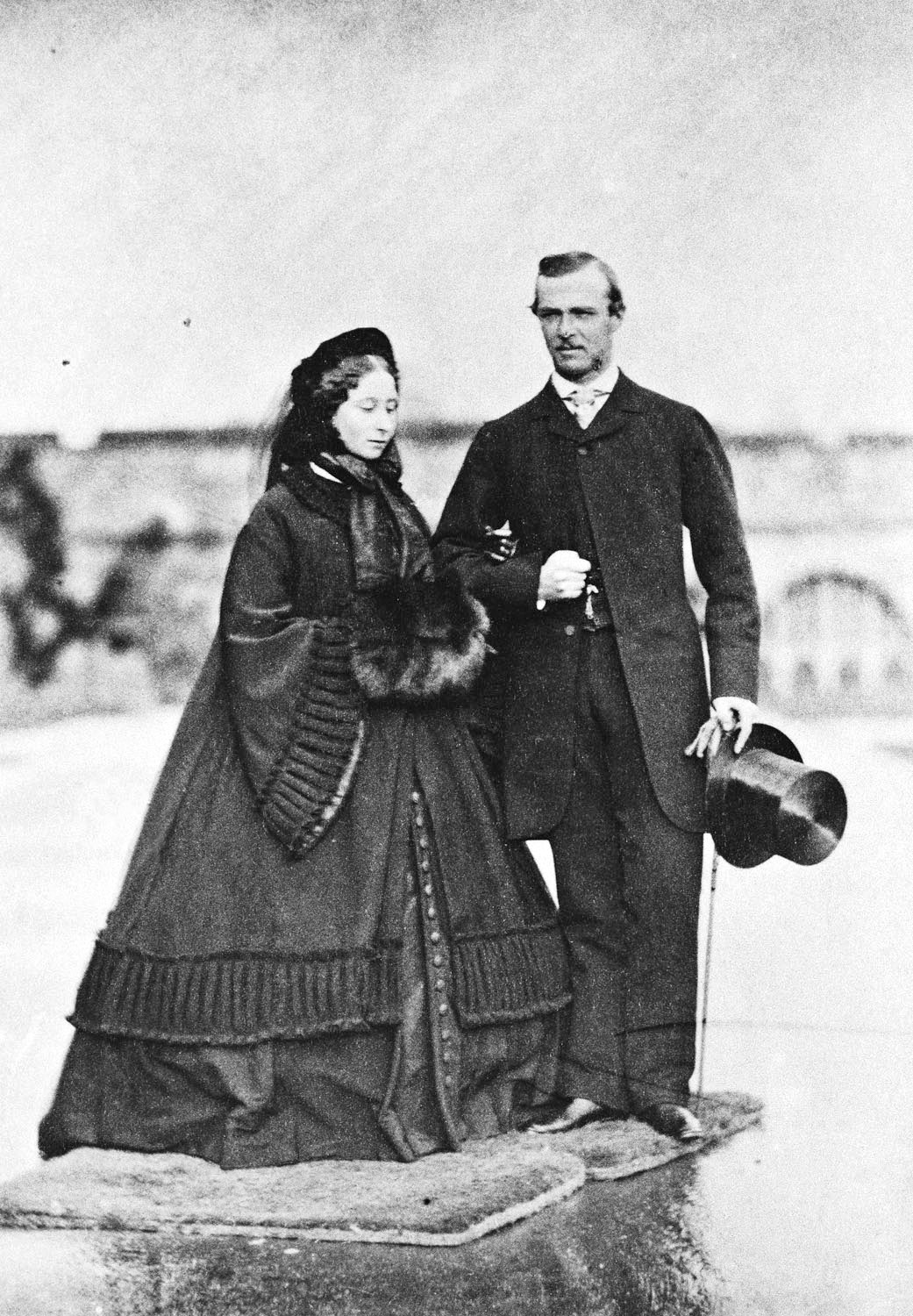
Louis IV, Grand Duke of Hesse and his wife Princess Alice of the United Kingdom in December 1860

The Grand Duchess Mathilde, a sister of King Maximilian II of Bavaria, died in 1862. A few weeks later, the crown prince Louis IV married Princess Alice of the United Kingdom (1843–1878), the second eldest daughter of Queen Victoria at Osborne House on the Isle of Wight. This marriage made Louis an in-law of Frederick, crown prince of Prussia, who was married to Alice's sister Victoria. This link changed the political climate in the grand duchy. Social questions became topical. In 1863, a workers' education society was established and in 1864 the Building Society for Workers' Housing (Bauverein für Arbeiterwohnungen) was established with the support of Louis and Alice. This society was based on British models and erected its first social housing complex, with 64 dwellings, between 1866 and 1868.

==== Lead-up to the Austro-Prussian War ====
Von Dalwigk still supported Austria and sought to prevent the creation of a Lesser Germany. In Paris, he sounded out interest in an alliance of middle powers against Prussia (and thus also against Great Britain). This agreement with a foreign initiative, directed against a German power, brought von Dalwigk into even greater disrepute with the Nationalists. In the face of the Schleswig–Holstein question, this discredited him significantly. When Austria and Prussia came to an agreement at the Gastein Convention, von Dalwigk proved to have chosen the wrong horse once again. He compounded this error in the following year when he took Hesse into the Austro-Prussian War on the Austrian side.

=== Austro-Prussian War (1866) ===
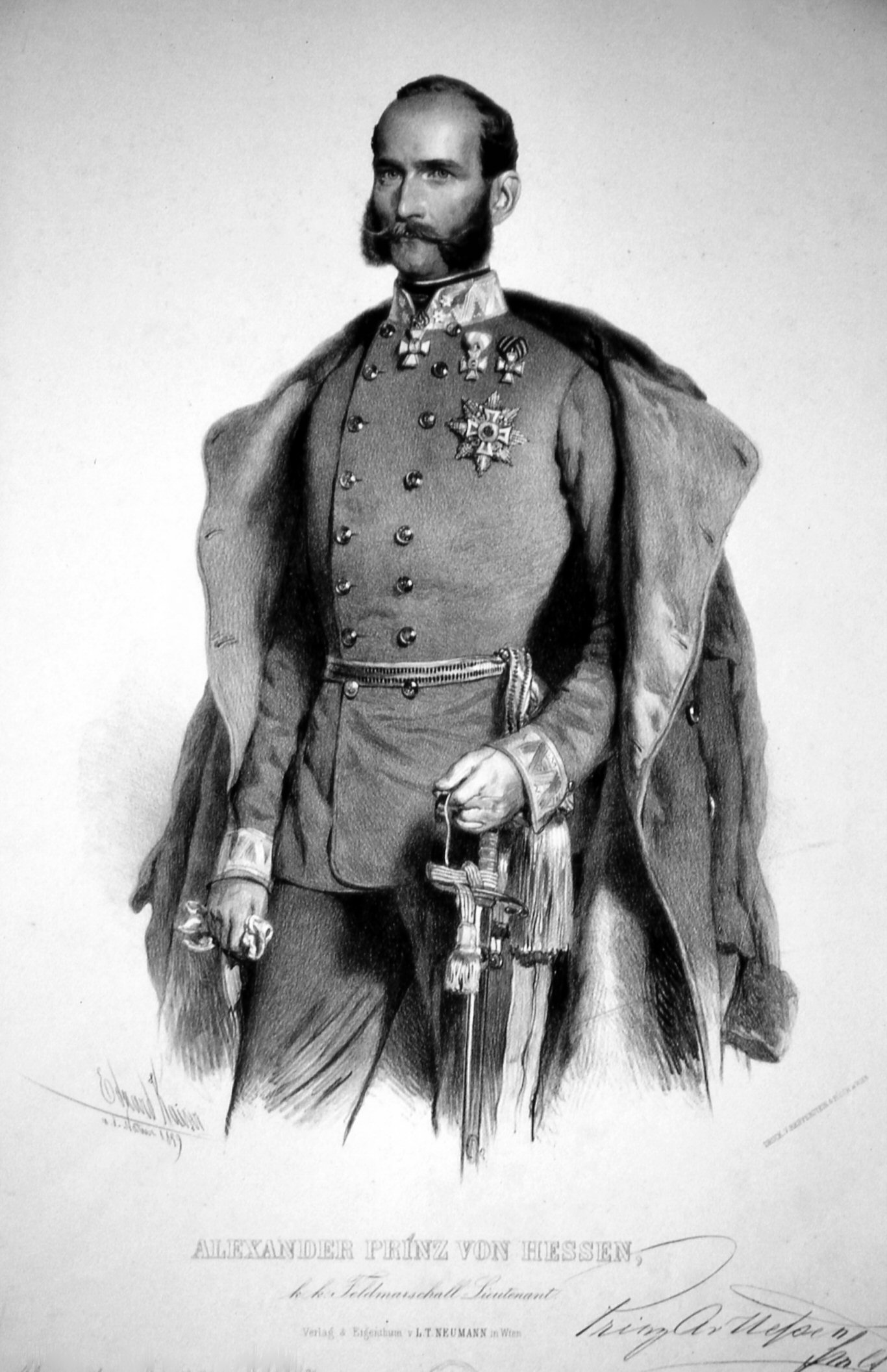
Prince Alexander of Hesse in his uniform as an Austrian lieutenant field marshal.

While Baden advocated "armed neutrality" in the brewing conflict between Austria and Prussia, von Dalwigk entered the war on the Austrian side immediately after hostilities broke out in June 1866. Initially, the Landstände refused to grant the government the right to issue war bonds, but they backed down in the face of popular opposition, once the government reduced its request from 4 million guilder to 2.5 million.

In anticipation of the Austro-Prussian War, command of the 8th Army of the confederation (around 35,000 men) was entrusted to Prince Alexander, brother of Grand Duke Louis III. Although he was a Russian general and an Austrian lieutenant field marshal, he had no actual military experience. The ultimate military disaster was not attributed to him in the end. Mobilisation in Hesse began on 16 May 1866.

On 14 June 1866, Prussian forces marched into the Duchy of Holstein and the forces of the German Confederation faced off against Prussia. The Hessian troops were ready to march, but it took more than two weeks to gather the rest of the 8th Army in Frankfurt. Eventually, the army marched through Upper Hesse to the northeast. When the outcome of the war was decided by the Prussian victory at the Battle of Königgrätz on 3 July 1866, the Hessian forces had still not encountered the enemy. On 6 July 1866, Prince Alexander halted his advance and returned home, but not quickly enough. On 13 July 1866, he was intercepted by Prussian troops at Aschaffenburg. In the following Battle of Frohnhofen, 800 Hessian soldiers were killed or wounded – 15% of all their deployed forces. Their continued retreat southwards led to a second defeat at the Battle of Tauberbischofsheim on 24 July 1866.

The Hessian General Karl August von Stockhausen shot himself on 11 December 1866 during investigations into the military disaster. The Hessian Minister of War, Friedrich von Wachter was replaced on 28 December 1866.

==== Peace treaty ====
The crown princes of Hesse and Prussia arranged a cease fire in the middle of July. Dalwigk rejected this in the hope that France would enter the war against Prussia. On 31 July, Prussian troops occupied Darmstadt without a battle.

After its defeat in the war, Hesse was forced to concede territory to Prussia in the Treaty of 3 September 1866. Due to the intervention of Alexander II of Russia, the brother-in-law of Grand Duke Louis III, this was a relatively mild treaty. Bismarck had originally intended to annex the whole of Upper Hesse. Instead, Hesse lost only 82 km^{2} (32 sq mi) and gained nearly 10 km (6.2 mi) when Prussia gave the grand duchy various enclaves within Hessian territory that had previously belonged to states which Prussia had annexed outright. All of these new territories were located in Upper Hesse, aside from Rumpenheim, which was south of the Main river in Strakenburg province. The territory of Hesse-Homburg, inherited by the grand duke earlier in the year on the extinction of its ruling line, was among the territories that passed to Prussia.

Hesse was also required to pay three million guilder in war indemnities and hand its telegraph network over to the Prussians.

==== Aftermath ====
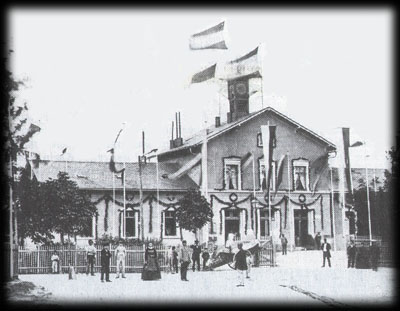
Worms station decorated for the reception of William I of Prussia, 1868.

The war did not lead to the dismissal of Dalwigk. Grand Duke Louis III remained committed to him, although his anti-Prussian policy and his very person were now a burden to the country.

One consequence of the peace treaty of 1866 was that the whole area north of the Main river (the Province of Upper Hesse, as well as Mainz-Kastel and Mainz-Kostheim in the Mainz district of Rhine-Hesse Province) became part of the North German Confederation. Subsequently, Dalwigk's government attempted to prevent or at least to delay the integration of the rest of Hesse into the confederation. The only justification he would accept for southern Hesse joining the confederation was if France were to start a war with Prussia.

Dalwigk also attempted to delay the integration of the Hessian army into the Prussian Army for as long as possible. This led crown prince Louis IV to resign as commander of the Grand Ducal Hessian (25th) Division and caused the Prussian Adjutant general Adolf von Bonin to issue a blatant threat to the grand duke. Minister of War, Eduard von Grolman, who had actually implemented Dalwigk's delaying policy in military matters, was fired, but Dalwigk was allowed to remain in post. When King William I of Prussia came to Worms in 1868 for the dedication of the Luther Monument, his first visit to the grand duchy since the war, which was interpreted as a gesture of reconciliation, "Dalwigk was conveniently away visiting relatives in Livonia."

=== Hesse in the German Empire (1870–1914) ===
==== Proclamation of the German Empire ====
In the Franco-Prussian War, the grand duchy fought alongside the North German Confederation, which it joined partway through the war on 20 October 1870. Despite Bismarck's hatred of him, Dalwigk travelled to Versailles for the negotiations about Hesse's entrance into the new German union. The treaty on the grand duchy's admission to the Confederation was signed on 15 November 1870, without Hesse receiving any reserved powers, unlike the other negotiating states. The Landstände ratified the treaty on 20 December 1870. At the Proclamation of the German Empire on 18 January 1871 in the Hall of Mirrors at the Palace of Versailles, the grand duchy was represented by crown prince Louis. Grand Duke Louis III accepted the event on account of the changed circumstances, but with a heavy heart and he remained very distant from the development.

As a result of documents discovered in France which revealed Dalwigk's political intrigues with the French, his position finally became unsustainable. However, it was only when Louis III was directly instructed to fire Dalwigk during a visit to Berlin, that he was forced to give in and dismiss him on 1 April 1871. The new chief minister was the former Minister of Justice, Friedrich von Lindelof, a final attempt at resistance by Louis III, before he appointed Prussia's preferred candidate, Karl von Hofmann in 1872. After this, Louis III completely stepped back from government, handing over public duties to the crown prince and princess. This led to the development of a glorified image of him and, at the death of "Uncle Louis" in 1877, it was largely forgotten that his rule had consisted of a series of political conflicts and missteps.

==== A small state in the German Empire ====
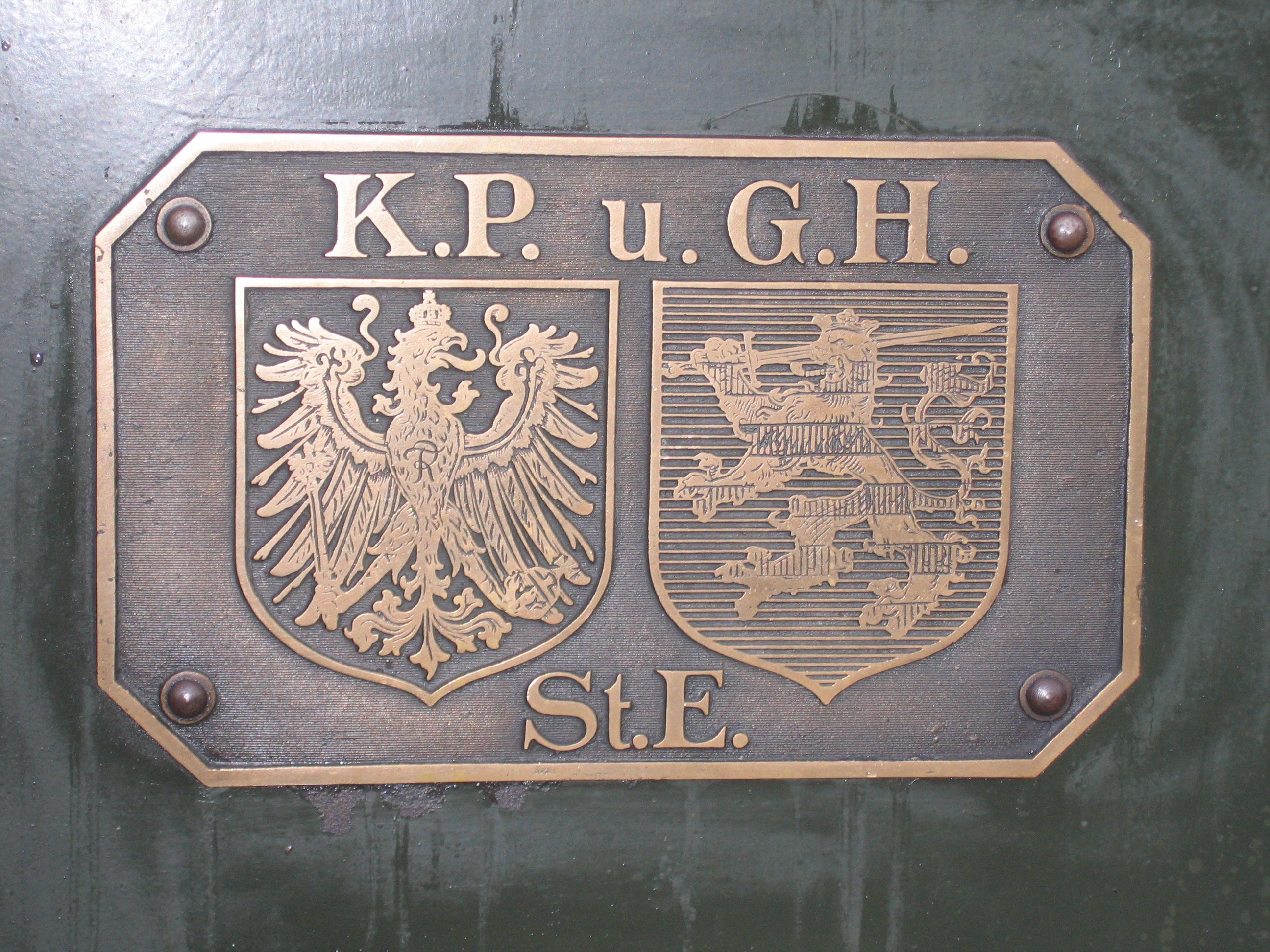
Double coat of arms on a locomotive of the Prussian-Hessian Railway Company.

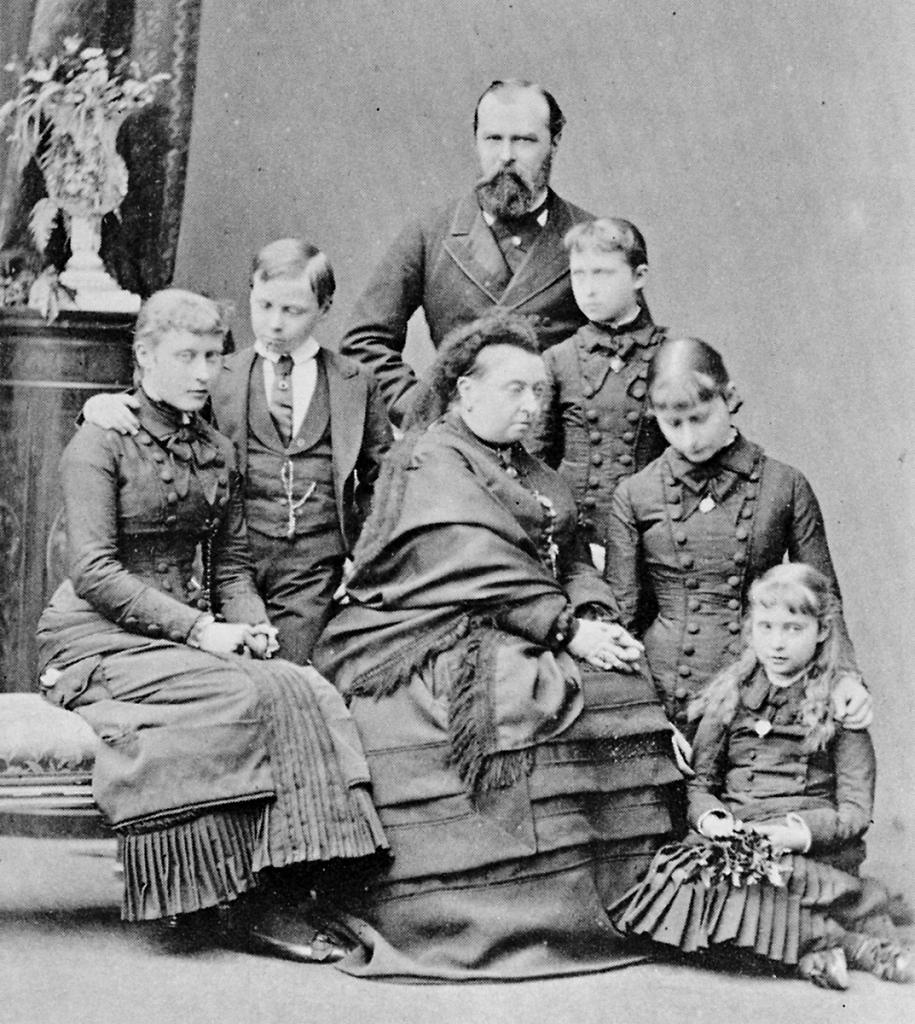
Grand Duke Louis IV with his mother-in-law Queen Victoria and his children.

The grand duchy was the sixth-largest state of the German Empire and the largest one to have no reserved powers. Its 853,000 inhabitants in 1875 were 2% of the Empire's total population. This small size alone pushed the grand duchy into insignificance. In addition, the Constitution of the German Empire assigned many of its former powers to Berlin. These included:

- The integration of the Hessian military into the Prussian Army. This was effected by a military convention which was signed on 13 June 1871 and came into force on 1 January 1872. The Hessian ministry of war was abolished. The result of this was that higher command positions were filled by Prussians.
- The largest reform of law and justice in the 19th century, in which projects that the grand duchy had failed to accomplish since 1803, like the legal unification of the whole country, were brought to completion by imperial laws, like the:
  - Imperial Penal Code of 1872;
  - Imperial Justice Code of 1877 (consisting of the Jurisdiction Act, Civil procedure code, Criminal procedure code, and the Bankruptcy ordinance)
  - Civil Law Book of 1896, which came into force on 1 January 1900.

The resulting restructuring of the laws of the country was limited and the new laws were largely concordant with the old ones.

- The incorporation of the Hessian railroads into the Prussian state railways in 1896, under the company name, Prussian-Hessian Railway Company.

The grand duchy's most significant loss was concealed to some extent by dynastic connections: Crown Prince Louis was the son-in-law of Queen Victoria. He was a brother-in-law of Edward VII, heir to the British throne, and of the Prussian heir, Frederick. His daughter was married to the Tsar Nicholas of Russia. These links were reflected in the presence of British, Russian, and Prussian envoys in the tiny Hessian capital of Darmstadt. The limited practical significance of this was shown by the inability of this Europe-wide network to prevent the outbreak of the First World War.

Louis IV's successor, Ernest Louis was referred to in Berlin as the "Red Grand Duke", because the Prussian envoy had scandalously seen him speak with Carl Ulrich, the leader of the SPD on several occasions.

Under these circumstances, the grand duchy retained only the power to concentrate on internal politics, especially social and cultural affairs.

==== Political reforms ====
- An ordinance of 1874 reorganised the top state offices. This also abolished the Ministry for Foreign Affairs, since external relations were now controlled by the German Empire. Hitherto, the Minister for Foreign Affairs had also served as Minister of the Grand Ducal House, a job which was now entrusted to the Chief Minister.
- In the same year, the middle level of the administration was also reformed on the model of the Prussian District Ordinance of 1872. The districts (Kreise) served both as administrative subdivisions of the state and as self-governing local areas. The old district councils (Bezirksräte), which had only an advisory role, were replaced by communally elected district councils (Kreistage). At the same time, the number of districts was reduced from 18 to 12.
- The local self-government of the cities and municipalities was also expanded by new regulations in 1874.
- Also in 1874, the Protestant national church received a new constitution with a strong role for synods.
- In 1911, the voting system for the lower chamber of the Landstände was modernised. Census suffrage was abolished, but all voters over fifty years old received two votes. Around 20% of the population was entitled to vote. This relatively low proportion was due to the fact that women did not receive voting rights and because the demographic structure of the grand duchy meant that relatively few men were over the voting age. The upper chamber was revised, so that was now a representative of the Technical University of Darmstadt (analogous to the existing representative of the University of Giessen) and a representative for each of the three legally recognised sectors of employment: trade and industry, craftwork, and agriculture.

Until the end of the monarchy (and afterwards), officials were recruited mostly from old local families of officials and sometimes graduates of the University of Giessen. This ensured the continued existence of a liberal internal policy, unlike the neighbouring Prussian Province of Hesse-Nassau, where the district councillors often came from the east of the kingdom and were politically conservative. Even Carl Ulrich, later president of the People's State of Hesse, who was repeatedly arrested under the Anti-Socialist Laws found that "the law in Hesse is implemented very mildly."

==== Social policy ====
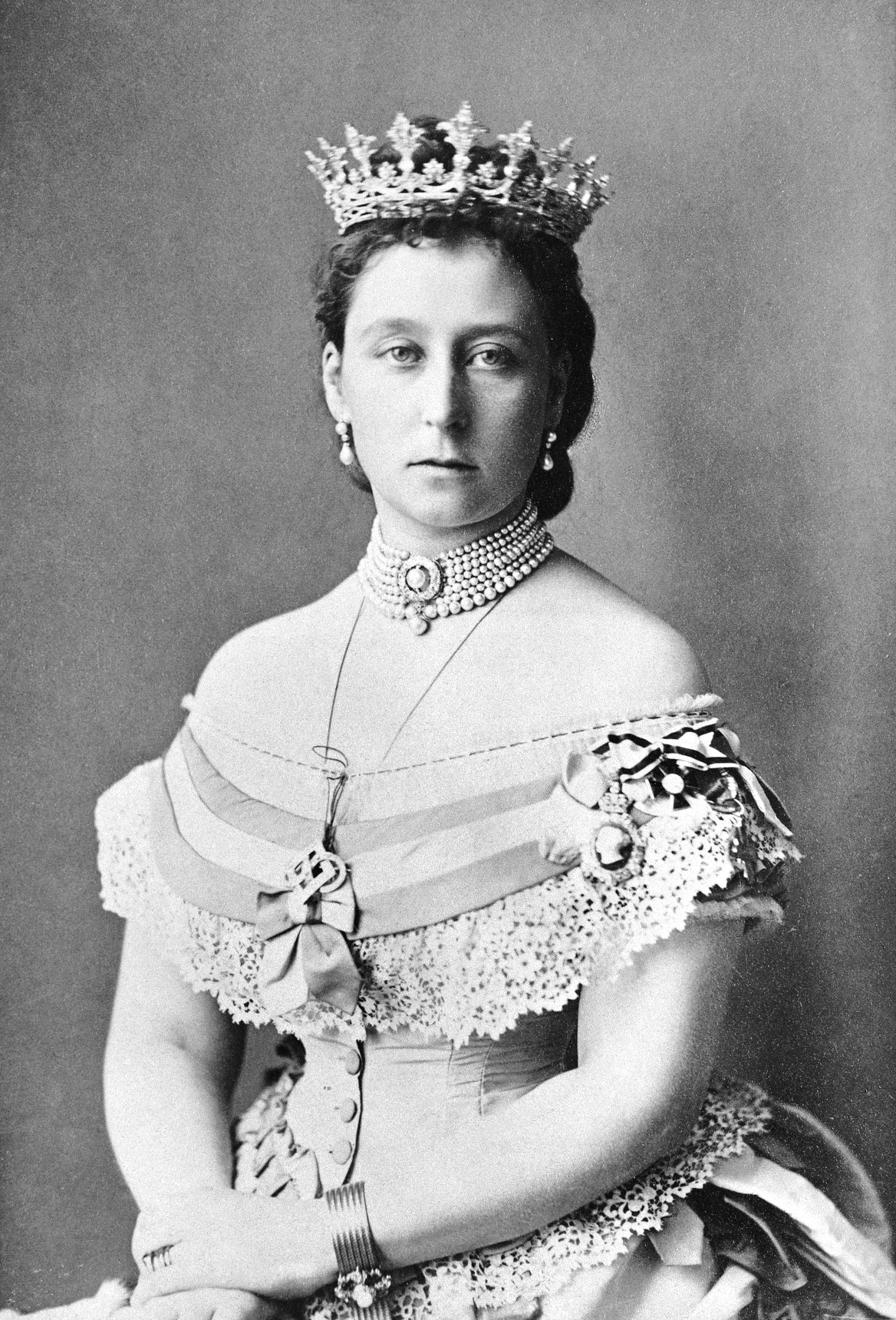
Grand Duchess Alice, Photograph by Franz Backofen, 1871.

In the social sphere, Grand Duchess Alice took the lead. With her help, the "Alice Women's Society for Nurses" (Alice-Frauenverein für Krankenpflege) was established. With advice from Florence Nightingale, the society organised a secular health service. At its foundation, the society already had 33 local branches and 2,500 members. This developed into the Alice Hospital, which still operates in Darmstadt today. Together with Luise Büchner, Alice established the "Society for the Development of Female Industry" (Verein für Förderung weiblicher Industrie), renamed the "Alice Society for Women's Education and Employment" (Alice-Verein für Frauenbildung und -Erwerb) in 1872. This society ran a market for women who worked at home ("the Alice Bazaar") and the Alice-School, a school that trained women for employment, which is now the Alice-Eleonoren-Schule in Darmstadt.

The country also engaged in health care. At the beginning of the twentieth century, its focus was on tuberculosis. The Ernest Ludwig Sanitorium for lung diseases was opened at Sandbach in 1900 and the Eleonore Sanitorium for Women (now the Eleonore Clinic) in Winterkasten in 1905, both in the Odenwald. From 1908, Grand Duchess Eleonore participated in "the Grand Duchess' Sales Days" to raise money for this cause.

At the baptism of the Crown Prince George Donatus, Grand Duchess Eleonore founded the "Grand Ducal Centre for the Care of Mothers and Infants" (Großherzogliche Zentrale für Mütter- und Säuglingsfürsorge), which maintained a national advice network and help centres with nurses. In 1912, the Centre joined with the aviation pioneer, August Euler (1868–1957), in his aircraft the Gelber Hund and with the LZ 10 Schwaben zeppelin to organise the Postcard week of the Grand Duchess and Airmail in Rhein and Main, which raised 100,000 marks for the cause.

A major problem facing the rapidly growing population was the shortage of housing. Around the turn of the century, the population of the grand duchy passed one million people. A series of building societies were established – in 1905 there were around forty. The most important was the "Ernest Louis Society: Hessian Central Society for the Construction of Affordable Housing" (Ernst-Ludwig-Verein. Hessischer Zentralverein zur Errichtung billiger Wohnungen), in which the Wormser industrialist, Cornelius Wilhelm von Heyl zu Herrnsheim played a leading role. The "Ernest Louis Society" participated in the construction of a worker's village for the 1908 National Exhibition at the Mathildenhöhe in Darmstadt. Von Heyl was also a member of the Reichstag and president of the upper chamber of the Hessian Landstände from 1874 to 1912. There he was responsible for the "Law on Housing Support for the Less Wealthy" of 1902, which provided simplified possibilities for finance. This improved on an earlier law passed in 1893. Additionally, the 1902 law created a National Housing Inspectorate ("Landeswohnungsinspektion", which monitored the state of the housing market and reported it on it. This made the grand duchy the leading state of the German Empire with respect to housing policy. Von Heyl also established the "Action Society for the Construction of Affordanble Housing" (Aktiengesellschaft zur Erbauung billiger Wohnungen), which built a total of 250 houses with 450 inhabitants in Worms within a few years. Most of these houses are now the very upmarket district of Kiautschau in Worms.

==== Cultural policy ====
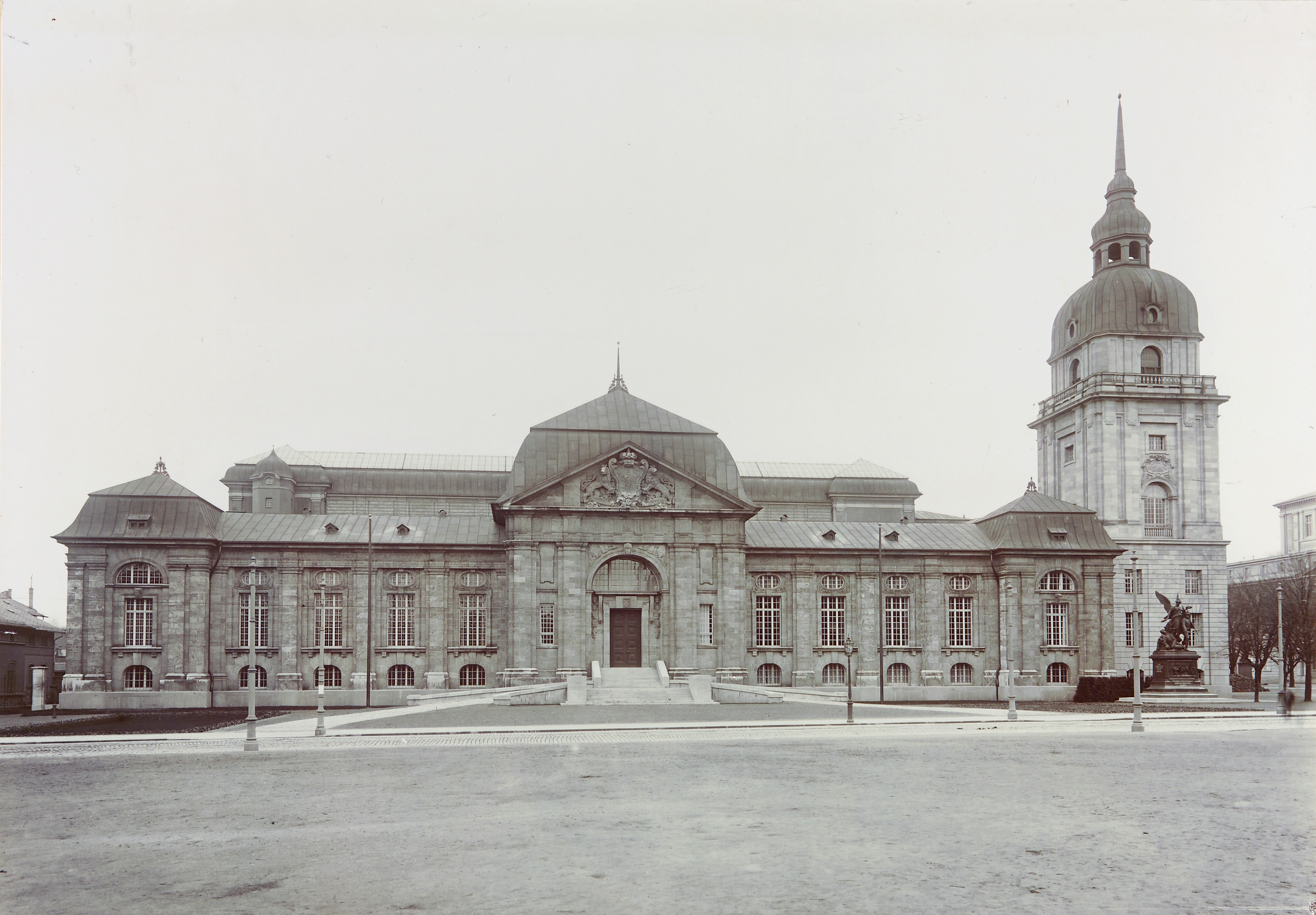
Hessisches Landesmuseum, Darmstadt, 1906

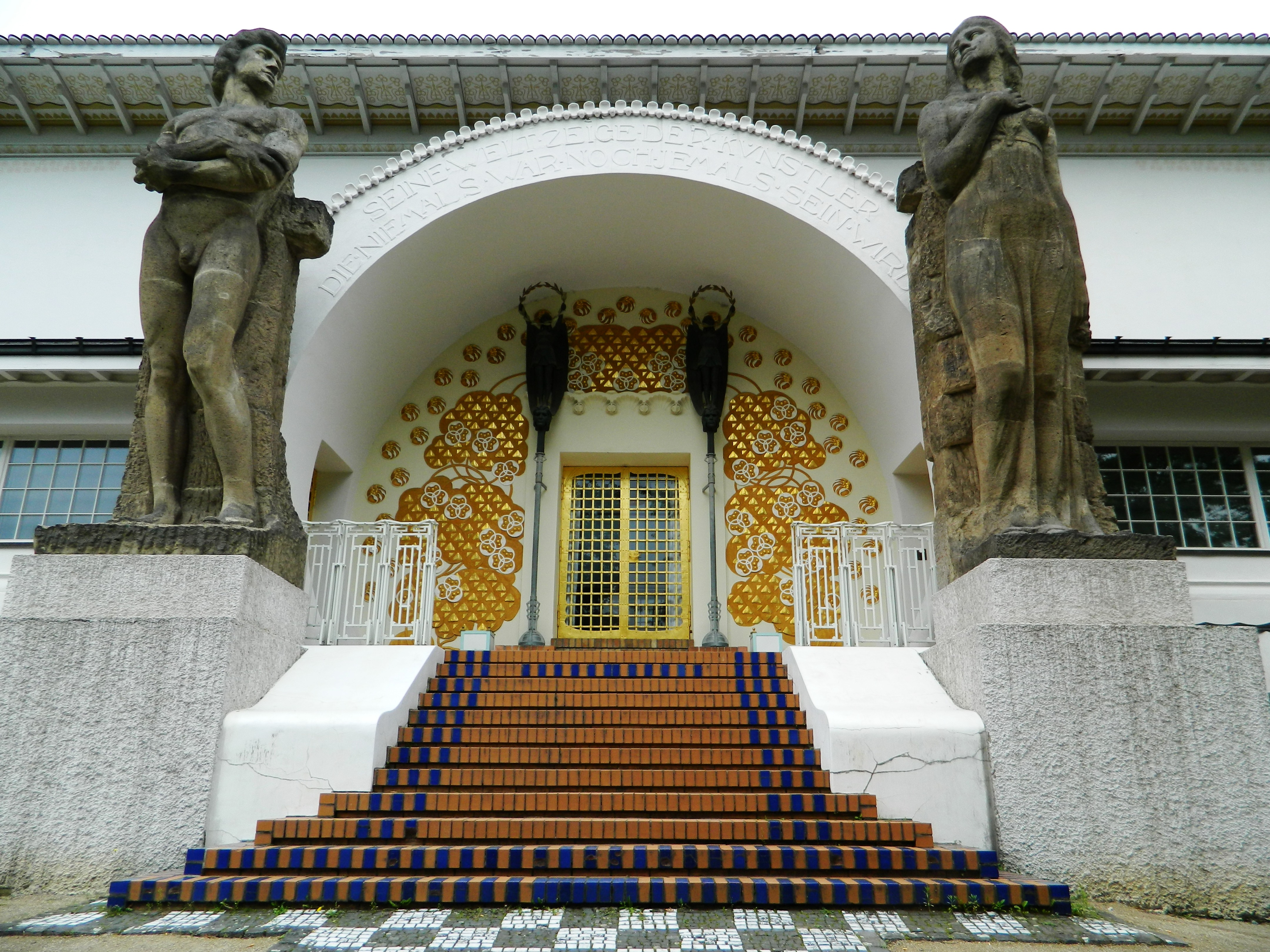
Ernst-Ludwig-Haus, main entrance.

In the cultural sphere, the Kulturkampf was of great significance in the first years of the German Empire. After some delay, the grand duchy brought the Prussian measures into force. The duchy's Catholic bishop, Wilhelm Emmanuel von Ketteler of Mainz, a strict conservative, had worked closely with von Dalwigk and was fiercely opposed to the liberals. The Darmstadt government sought to gain a higher level of control over the Roman Catholic church and the bishop led opposition to this. A whole bundle of laws were put forward by the government in 1875 to achieve this. The bishop sought to maintain the highest possible level of autonomy by all means at his disposal, but in 1876 he had to close the seminary in Mainz and the church was not able to open it again until 1887. After Ketteler's death in 1877, the bishop's seat remained vacant until 1886, as a result of the conflict between the state and the Catholic church, since the state vetoed all candidates for the position that were put forward by the Church.

The beginning of the reign of the last Grand Duke, Ernest Louis, in 1892 at the age of twenty-three saw a marked focus on cultural policy. He rejected plans for the new Landesmuseum in Darmstadt, because he considered the plans "hideous and too pretentious, a disfigurement of the city and a disgrace for the government." The Grand Duke sought out the Berlin architect Alfred Messel instead and the museum which he built was widely praised.

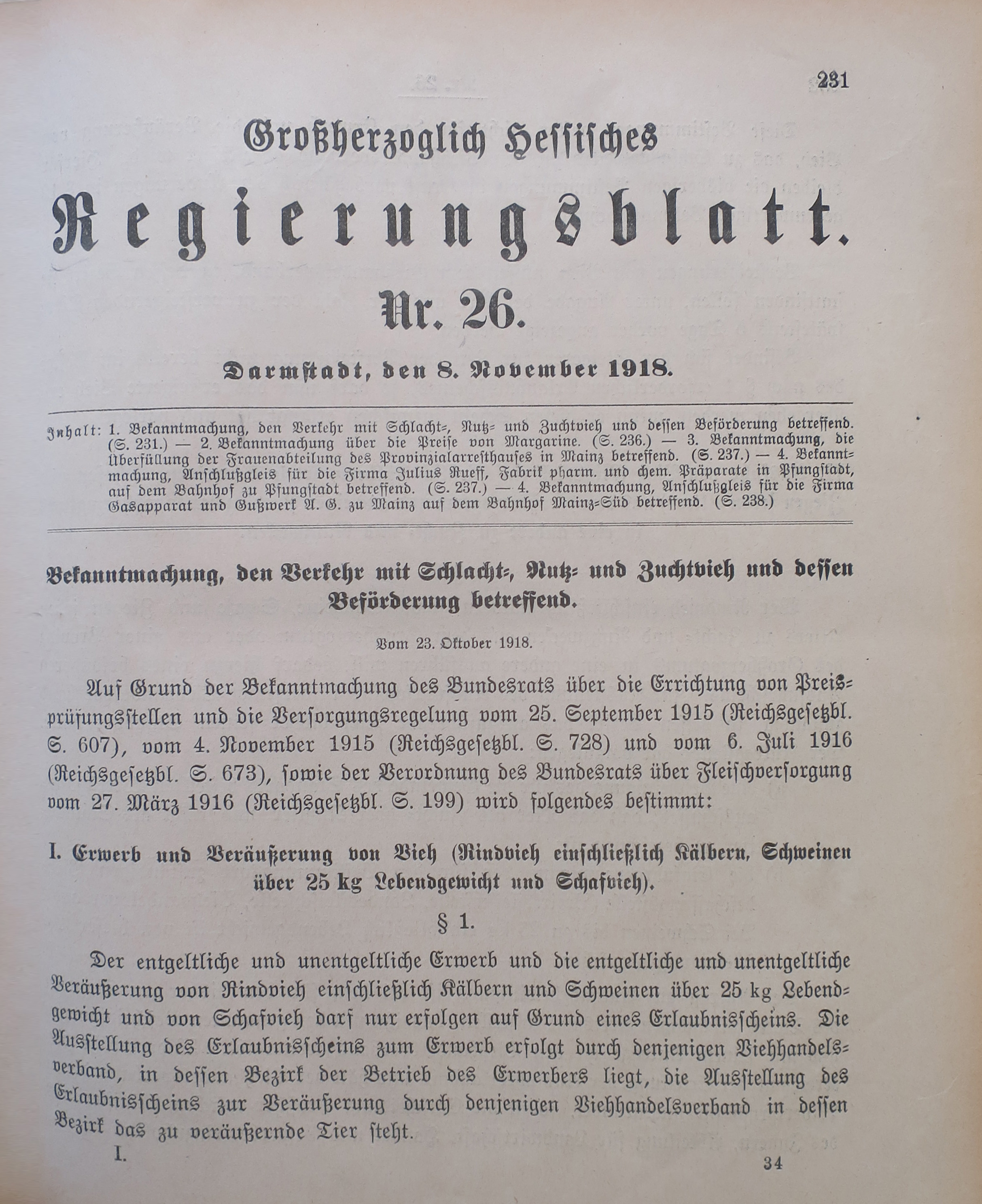
Final issue of the Grand Duchy of Hesse's gazette, 8 November 1918, one day before the fall of the grand duchy.

The most famous project of Grand Duke Ernest Louis is the Darmstadt Artists' Colony, a project, which his mother, Grand Duchess Alice, had first conceived, but had not brought to fruition due to her early death. The colony and its four art and craft exhibition halls on Mathildenhöhe have been a UNESCO World Heritage Site since 2021.

=== First World War and end of the grand duchy (1914–1918) ===
Under the German Empire's military constitution, Hessian troops participated in World War I as part of the Imperial German Army. Grand Duke Ernest Louis was nominally an infantry general, but he did not exercise an active command. He did visit the headquarters of the Grand Ducal Hessian (25th) Division in France several times. A total of 32,000 men from this unit died during the war. In summer 1918, Darmstadt was hit by allied airstrikes.

During the November Revolution, Grand Duke Ernest Louis was removed from power on 9 November 1918 by the Darmstadt Workers' and Soldiers' Council. In 1919, the Grand Duke released the officials of Hesse from their oaths of service to him, but he never issued an explicit abdication. (Note: Ludwig III of Bavaria (see Anif declaration) and Friedrich, Prince of Waldeck and Pyrmont acted similarly. All the other German monarchs did abdicate.) The grand duchy received a republican constitution and was renamed the People's State of Hesse (Volksstaat Hessen).

== Government ==
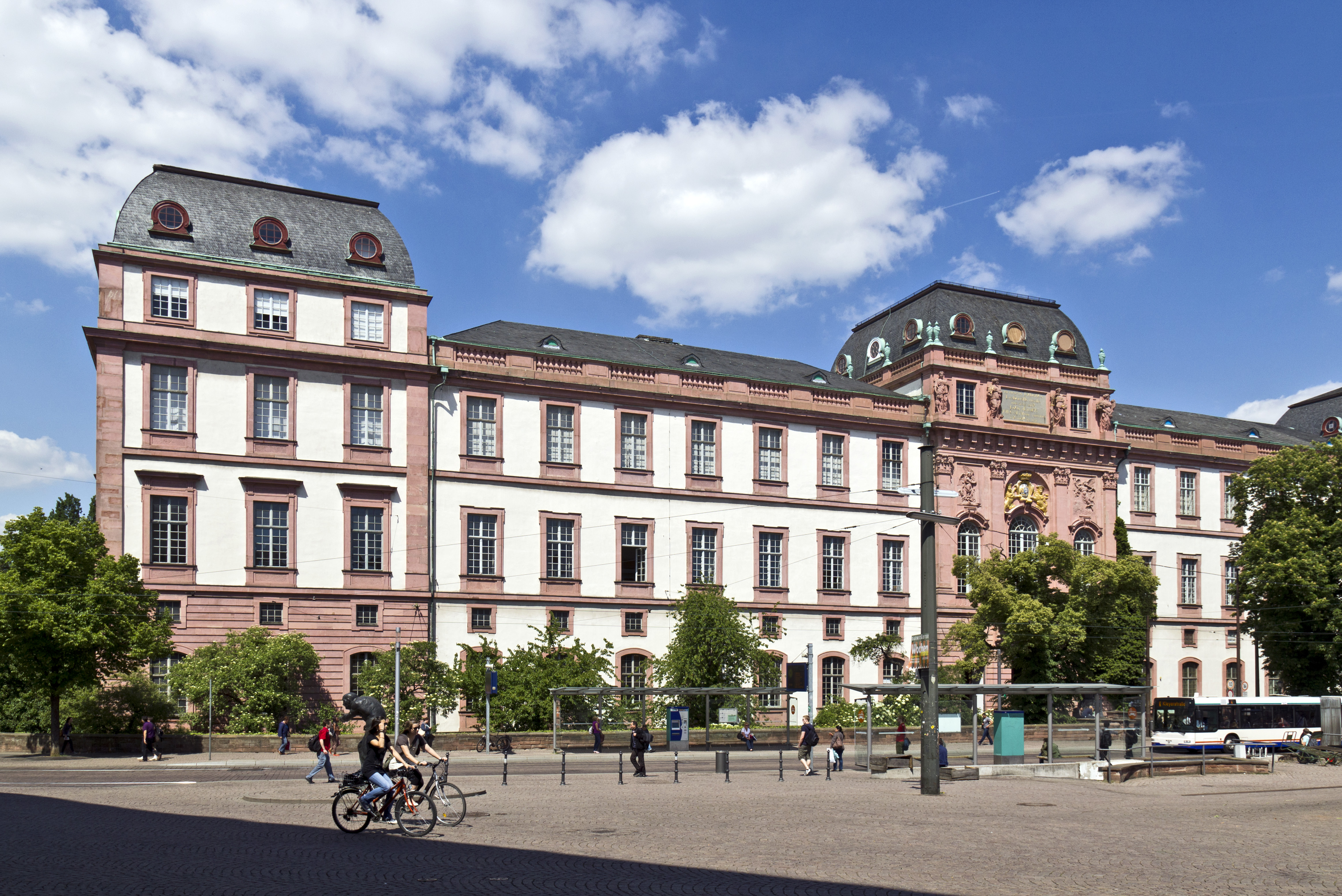
The Residenzschloss (Residential Palace Darmstadt) of the Grand Dukes

=== Grand Duke ===
The constitution issued on 17 December 1820 by Grand Duke Louis I ended absolutism in the grand duchy, in favour of a constitutional monarchy, but the grand duke retained substantial authority. As the head of state, "all rights of state power" were invested in him and his person was "sacred and inviolable". He led the executive.

Name	Portrait	Birth	Marriage(s)	Death
Louis I (Ludwig I); 14 August 1806 – 6 April 1830 (Landgrave Louis X from 1790)		14 June 1753 in Prenzlau	Louise of Hesse-Darmstadt	6 April 1830 in Darmstadt
Louis II (Ludwig II); 6 April 1830 – 16 June 1848 (Note: Louis III was named co-regent on 5 March 1848 and was de facto sole ruler thereafter, as Louis II stepped back from government completely.)		26 December 1777 in Darmstadt	Wilhelmine of Baden	16 June 1848 in Darmstadt
Louis III (Ludwig III); 5 March 1848 – 13 June 1877		9 June 1806 in Darmstadt	Mathilde Caroline of Bavaria	13 June 1877 in Seeheim
Louis IV (Ludwig IV); 13 June 1877 – 13 March 1892		12 September 1837 in Bessungen	Princess Alice of the United Kingdom	13 March 1892 in Darmstadt
Ernest Louis (Ernst Ludwig); 13 March 1892 – 9 November 1918		25 November 1868 in Darmstadt	Victoria Melita of Saxe-Coburg and Gotha; Eleonore of Solms-Hohensolms-Lich	9 October 1937 in Schloß Wolfsgarten, Langen

=== Landstände ===
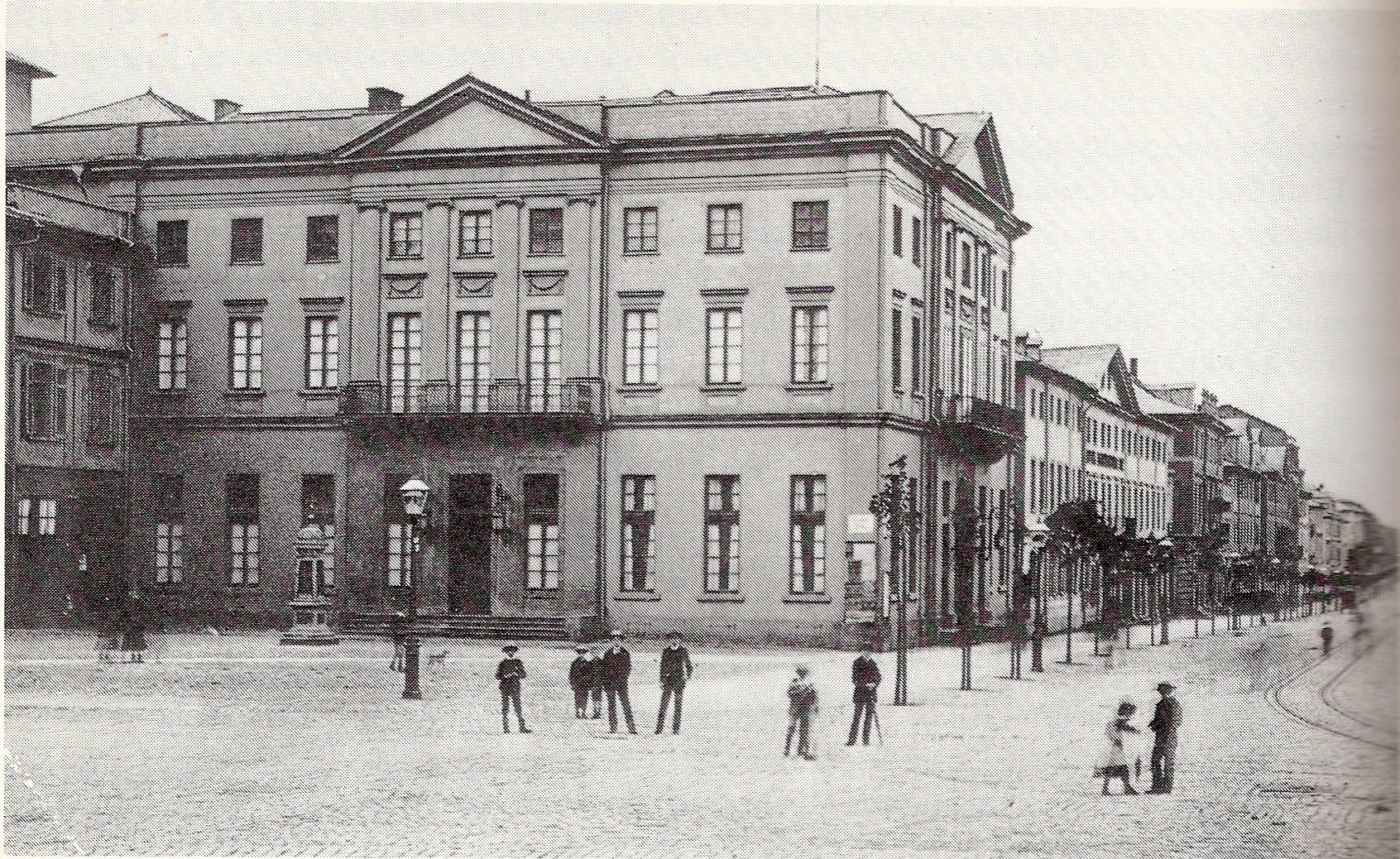
The Ständehaus on Luisenplatz in Darmstadt (1888), seat of the Landstände of the Grand Duchy of Hesse

The Landstände (national estates) was the bicameral legislature which linked the subjects of the grand duchy to the grand duke and his government. It was created by the Hessian constitution of 1820 and survived until the November Revolution in 1918, when it was succeeded by the Landtag of the People's State of Hesse.

==== Upper chamber ====
The Upper Chamber consisted of the princes of the grand ducal house, the heads of the Standesherr families, the Hereditary Marshal (since 1432, the head of the Riedesel barons of Eisenach), the Catholic bishop responsible for Hesse (i.e. the Bishop of Mainz), a representative of the Protestant Church in Hesse (appointed for life by the grand duke), the chancellor of the University of Giessen, and ten Hessian citizens, whom the grand duke could grant a seat to, in recognition of special service. In order to take up a seat in the Upper Chamber, one had to be over 25 years of age.

This system was interrupted in 1849, when the Upper Chamber was reformed to contain 25 representatives, elected by census suffrage. However, the old system was restored in 1850.

==== Lower Chamber ====
The Lower Chamber contained the elected representatives. The electoral law changed significantly over time. For a brief period after 1848, representatives were chosen by a direct vote of all (male) citizens, which was very progressive. In the reactionary period following the revolution, the indirect vote was restored in 1850, and then the three-class franchise was adopted in 1856. An additional electoral reform in 1872 reduced the number of representatives elected by the landed nobility and transferred those representatives to the Upper Chamber.

==== Legislative process ====
Theoretically, laws were issued by the grand duke, in close consultation with the Landstände. The Landstände had no sovereign power of their own. A law came about when the grand duke (in fact, his ministers) submitted a proposed law to the Landstände. After advice from the Landstände, the draft authorised by the Landstände would be sanctioned by the grand duke. This was the actual act which brought the law into force. Then it would be published in the Großherzoglich Hessisches Regierungsblatt ("Government Gazette of Grand Ducal Hesse"). Usually, laws came into force fourteen days after this proclamation. In addition, the grand duke had the power to issue emergency decrees (including substantive laws) in urgent situations if the Landstände could not be gathered quickly enough.

=== Executive ===
The government of the grand duchy was rearranged on 12 October 1803, being divided into ministerial departments for the first time: In 1821, an edict established that the government, now known as the State-Ministry or Whole-Ministry (Staats-Ministerium or Gesamt-Ministerium), would be led by one of the ministers, who would be known as the President of the United Ministries (Präsident der vereinten Ministerien). The Ministry of War remained separate from this arrangement. The title was changed to "Directing State-Minister" (Dirigierende Staatsminister) in 1829, "President of the Whole Ministry (Präsident des Gesamt-Ministeriums) in 1849, Minister-President (Ministerpräsident) in 1852.

The ministries of the grand duchy were:

- The Ministry External Affairs and the Grand Ducal House. The external affairs portion of the ministry was closed in 1874 and the responsibilities to the house were transferred to the Minister-President.
- The Ministry of Internal Affairs. This ministry included justice, until it became its own ministry in 1898.
- The Ministry of Finance
- The Ministry of War, which existed alongside these departments, but was independent from them. It was abolished in 1871.

=== Administrative subdivisions ===
From the beginning the grand duchy faced the problem of bringing its various disparate parts together. Even the core region, the Landgraviate of Hesse-Darmstadt, consisted of two separate parts: the "Old Hessian" region and the Upper County of Katzenelnbogen. In addition to this there were the territories received during secularisation and mediatisation in 1803, the treaty of the Confederation of the Rhine in 1806, and the former French areas received at the Vienna Congress in 1816. In the territorial expansion between 1803 and 1816, Hesse initially inherited and retained their particular administrative divisions. This meant that the provinces on the right bank of the Rhine, were divided into Ämtern, while Rhine Hesse retained the French administrative structure based on cantons (although partially using German terminology). The process of unifying and modernising divergent systems took almost the whole of the nineteenth century. A clear end point is 1 January 1900 when the extremely fragmented private law systems in Germany were replaced by the Bürgerliches Gesetzbuch, which applied to the Empire.

The lowest level subdivision was the municipality (Gemeinde).

==== First-order subdivisions ====
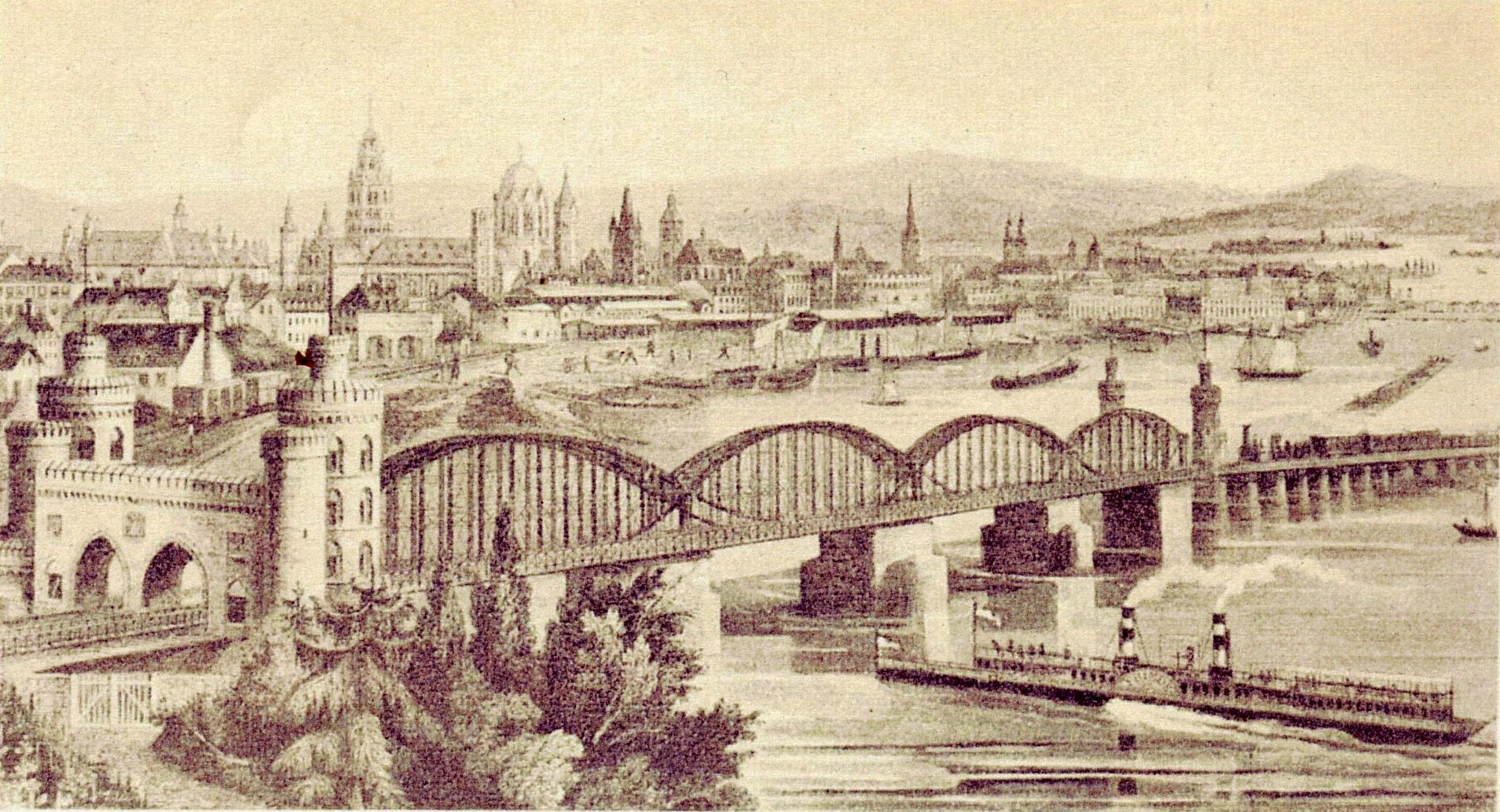
The Südbrücke at Mainz, the first permanent bridge between the portions of the grand duchy on the left and right banks of the Rhine, built in 1862

The first-order subdivisions of the grand duchy were the provinces:

- Starkenburg. Capital: Darmstadt. Territory: mainly right of the Rhine and south of the Main.
- Upper Hesse. Capital: Giessen. Territory: mainly north of the Main.
- Duchy of Westphalia (1803–1816). Capital: Arnsberg.
- Rhine-Hesse (1816–1918). Capital: Mainz. Territory: mainly left of the Rhine.

Starkenburg and the majority of Rhine Hesse were separated by the Rhine river and at first there was no permanent crossing between them. The first bridge was the Südbrücke at Mainz, which was built for the Mainz–Darmstadt–Aschaffenburg railway in 1862. Upper Hesse and Starkenburg were separated by foreign territory – the Electorate of Hesse and Free City of Frankfurt before 1866 and then the Kingdom of Prussia. This internal segmentation shaped the economic development of the grand duchy.

After the 1848 revolution, the provinces and districts were replaced with eleven "government districts" (Regierungsbezirken) at 31 July 1848. This reform was reversed in 1852 during the reactionary period, when the earlier division into three provinces was restored. This structure endured beyond the end of the grand duchy in 1918.

=== Military ===
Even before the establishment of the grand duchy, Hesse-Darmstadt had a standing army. This was expanded after 1816. Following the military convention with Prussia on 13 June 1871, the Hessian forces were incorporated into the Imperial German Army on 1 January 1872.

== Demographics ==
=== Nobility ===
The nobility of the grand duchy consisted of two classes with different privileges, the Standesherren (members of the mediatised houses) and the ritterschaftlichen Adel (knights).

Standesherren were the members of the nobility who had enjoyed imperial immediacy under the Holy Roman Empire and had been represented in the imperial diet. According to the Treaty of the Confederation of the Rhine of 1806, Stedesherren had special rights and possessed sovereignty over the areas that they ruled. Initially, there were nineteen Standesherren in the grand duchy, but by the end of the nineteenth century this had declined to seventeen. The Riedesel family held an equivalent status to the Standesherren. In total, about a quarter of the grand duchy's area and population belonged to the Standesherren. The privileges of the Standesheren declined over the nineteenth century and they finally lost their seats in the upper chamber of the Landstände in 1918.

The special position of the knights was established by the Grand Duke in 1807. Several of these nobles initially had control of their own local courts, the last of which were taken over by the state in the 1830s. The knights also had their own representatives in the Landstände. From 1820 until 1872, they had twenty representatives in the Lower chamber. After that, they instead had two representatives in the upper chamber. Only the richest families in Hesse could vote for these (probably around two dozen families).

=== Emigration ===
The constitution of 1820 guaranteed the right to emigrate, with some legal provisos. Due to the rising population, stagnating agricultural sector, and slow pace of industrialisation, there was continuous poverty among the lower class. From the 1840s several thousand people left the grand duchy every year (records do not exist for earlier periods). The government supported emigration in order to reduce the potential for social conflict. The local Gemeinden, which were responsible for supporting the poor, happily sent them overseas. The main destination was the United States, but Hessians also travelled to southern Russia, and, in one case, Algeria. In some cases the poor were actually forced to leave, as occurred in Wimpfen. In 1846, 672 people from Groß-Zimmern and neighbouring communities were "exported" and around fifty other Gemeinden followed this example. High points were the year 1846 when more than 6,000 people emigrated, and 1853, when 8,375 people did so, including many of those opposed to the reactionary policies of von Dalwigk. This was roughly 1% of the population. The grand duchy's population sank between 1850 and 1855 from 853,300 inhabitants to 836,424.

=== Religion ===
==== Protestantism ====
In the Protestant churches at the end of the 18th century, there were efforts to overcome the division between the Lutheran and Calvinist denominations, but there was also resistance to this. The state did not manage to settle this issue in a uniform manner. Thus, in the most progressive province, Rhine-Hesse, the clergy agreed a union in 1817, but bureaucratic obstacles meant that the state did not bring that agreement to fruition until Easter 1822. This union of the two confessions was called the United Evangelical Protestant Church in Rhine-Hesse (Vereinigte evangelisch-protestantische Kirche in Rheinhessen) and received its own church council in Mainz. In the other two provinces, similar agreements were only agreed at the level of individual parishes and many Lutheran and Calvinist churches remained separate. In 1832, a single Protestant church organisation for the whole of Hesse was established with its seat in Darmstadt. The existing united church in Mainz and the individual united church and school councils in Giessen and Darmstadt were brought under its umbrella. After this, the Evangelical National Church of Hesse was organisationally unified, although the two denominations retained separate churches and confessions in many places. In 1874, a charter with presbyterian-synodal elements was issued for the church, which was modelled on the Prussian Rhineland-Westphalia Church Ordinance of 1835. Henceforth, a national synod, which made church law in cooperation with the Landesherrn, was the summus episcopus (the supreme religious authority).

==== Catholicism ====
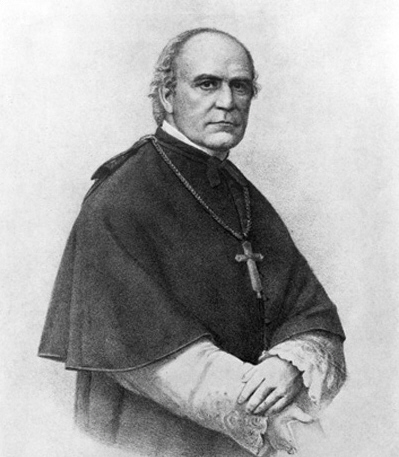
Wilhelm Emmanuel von Ketteler, Bishop 1850–1877

Around 25% of the inhabitants of the grand duchy were Roman Catholic. Due to the secularisation carried out at the end of the Holy Roman Empire, the Roman Catholic church was largely reliant on funds supplied by the state. The new organisation of the Catholic church in the grand duchy was the result of long negotiations which had already been underway long before the Congress of Vienna in 1815, as in the rest of southwest Germany. After the Kingdom of Bavaria sealed its own concordat with the Catholic Church in 1817, the other states of southwestern Germany began negotiations in 1818 in Frankfurt am Main to come up with a solution for their territories, which resulted in the papal bull Provida solersque of 1821. With respect to the grand duchy, this created the Diocese of Mainz, which became a suffragan diocese of the Archdiocese of Freiburg. The borders of diocese were exactly contiguous with those of the grand duchy and remain the same to this day.

The appointment of the first bishop was delayed due to disagreements about the appointment procedure. In 1827, Hesse and the Church agreed that the grand duchy could review the list of candidates for election and veto those that were not acceptable to it. The foundational document for the new diocese was signed in 1829 and the first bishop, Joseph Vitus Burg, took up the post in 1830. At the same time, a Roman Catholic faculty was added to the University of Giessen.

Bishop Wilhelm Emmanuel von Ketteler (1850–1877) played an important role in the social debate within the Catholic Church well beyond the borders of the diocese. In 1851, he founded a "Theological School at the Diocesan Seminary of Mainz" (theologische Lehranstalt am bischöflichen Seminar zu Mainz). This was allowed despite the reservations of the Hessian government and the Landstände, and the faculty of Roman Catholic theology at the University of Giessen was closed, after the retirement of the final professor. After the establishment of the German Empire in 1871, the conflict between Church and State erupted from around 1874, feeding into the Kulturkampf. Because the state vetoed all candidates, the bishop's seat remained vacant from the death of Kettler in 1877 until 1886.

==== Judaism ====
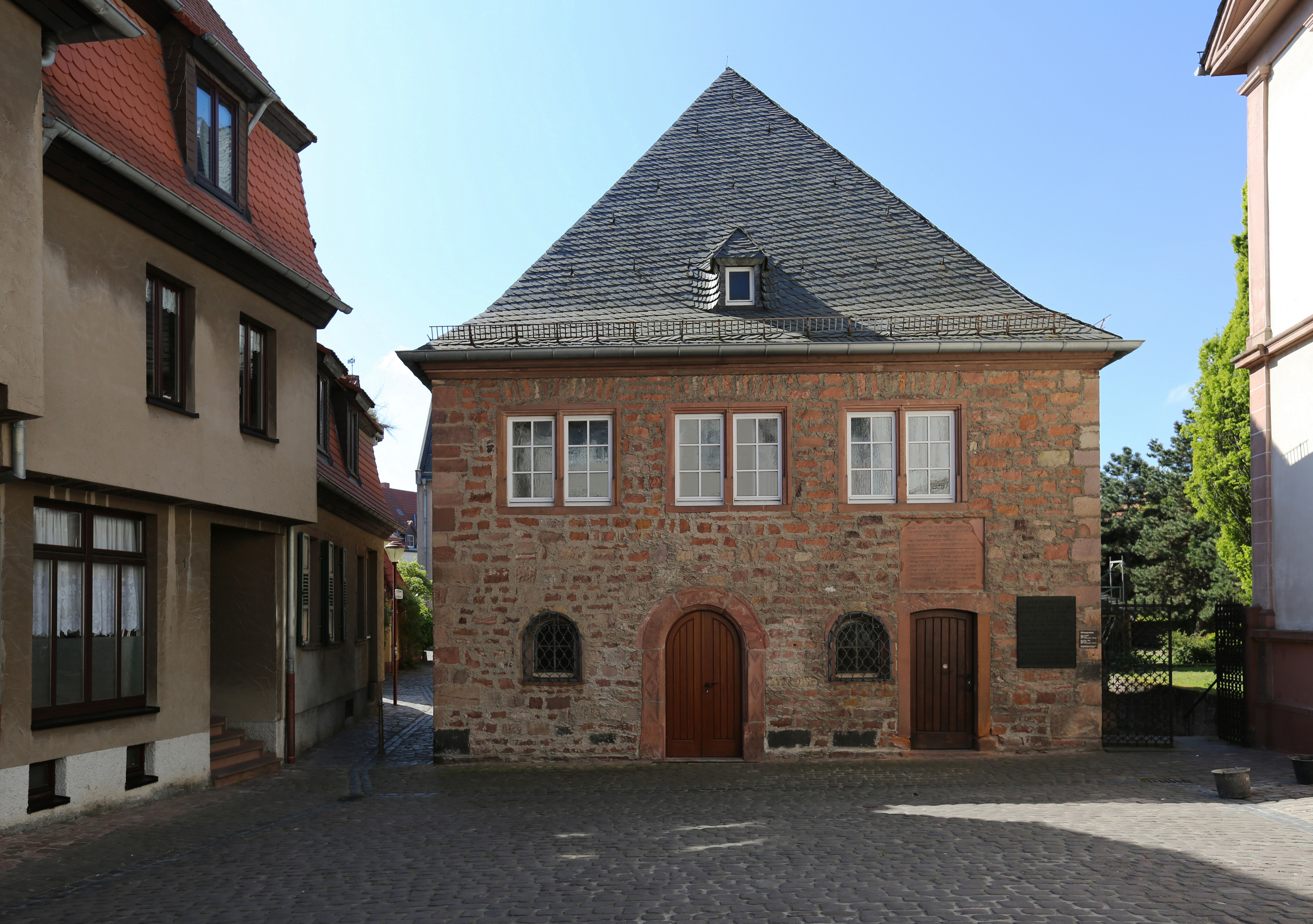
Synagoge of the Jewish community of Worms, the oldest Jewish community in the grand duchy.

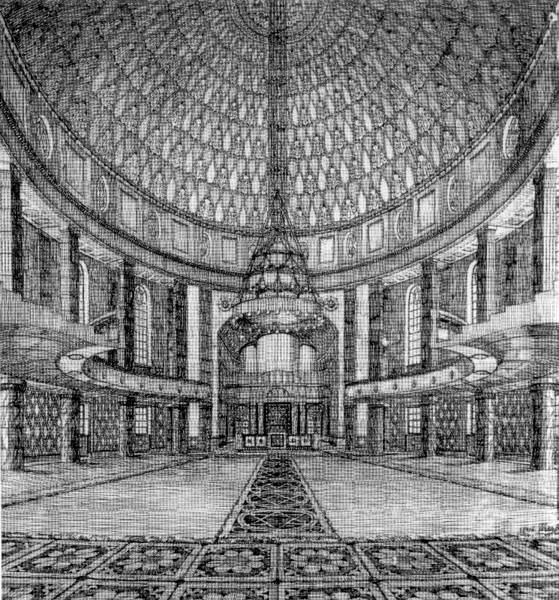
Interior of the Main Synagogue, Mainz.

Despite progressive attempts in the last years of the landgraviate of Hesse-Darmstadt, Jewish emancipation in the grand duchy took decades. While there were some very progressive theoretical approaches, such as a report by the young councillor Karl du Thil in 1809, advocating legal equality for Jews, only very small steps were taken in practice. Latent antisemitism was widespread and led to violence against Jews, in moments of crisis, like the famine of 1817/18 and the Revolution of 1848. By contrast, when the state wanted to strengthen its grasp on its Jewish subjects, it moved more quickly. Thus, an ordinance was passed in 1804 requiring Jewish subjects to be listed in government registers and another in 1808 requiring Jews to adopt "German" family names.

The constitution of 1820 placed equal status under a statutory reservation: "Non-Christians have national citizenship, if the law conferred it on them or if it is granted to them either explicitly or implicitly through a grant of the national administration." (Note: Art. 15 of the Constitution of 1820)

The Jewish communities of the grand duchy were joined in an association called the "Israelite Religious Society" (Israelitische Religionsgemeinschaft). The unification of the boards and property holdings of the individual Jewish societies was regulated and supervised by the state. Rabbis were appointed by the Ministry of the Interior and Justice. Unlike the Christian churches, the Religious Society received no state subsidies.

In 1848, Ferdinand Eberstadt became mayor of Worms, the first Jewish mayor in Germany, and in 1874 Samson Rothschild was the first Jew to be employed at a public school – also in Worms.

== Economy ==
The economic policy of the grand duchy from the beginning was to overcome the structures inherited from the 18th century and to modernise. The remaining monopolies were abolished in 1810 and procedures for granting commercial concessions were unified in the same year. The rights of guilds were gradually reduced and finally abolished in 1866.

=== Tolls ===
The relatively small area of the grand duchy and its neighbours posed a significant economic problem. This became clear in the winter famine of 1817/18, when grain deliveries were hindered by the borders between the German states and the tolls associated with them. In the following years, the government in Darmstadt made a series of attempts to make deals with its neighbours to reduce tolls, all of which failed due to fears about the loss of sovereignty. Thus, in 1828, the grand duchy signed a treaty for a customs union with Prussia. This Prussian-Hessian Customs Union was folded into the larger Zollverein in 1834.

=== Currency ===
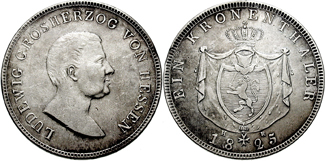
1 Kronenthaler of Grand Duke Louis I

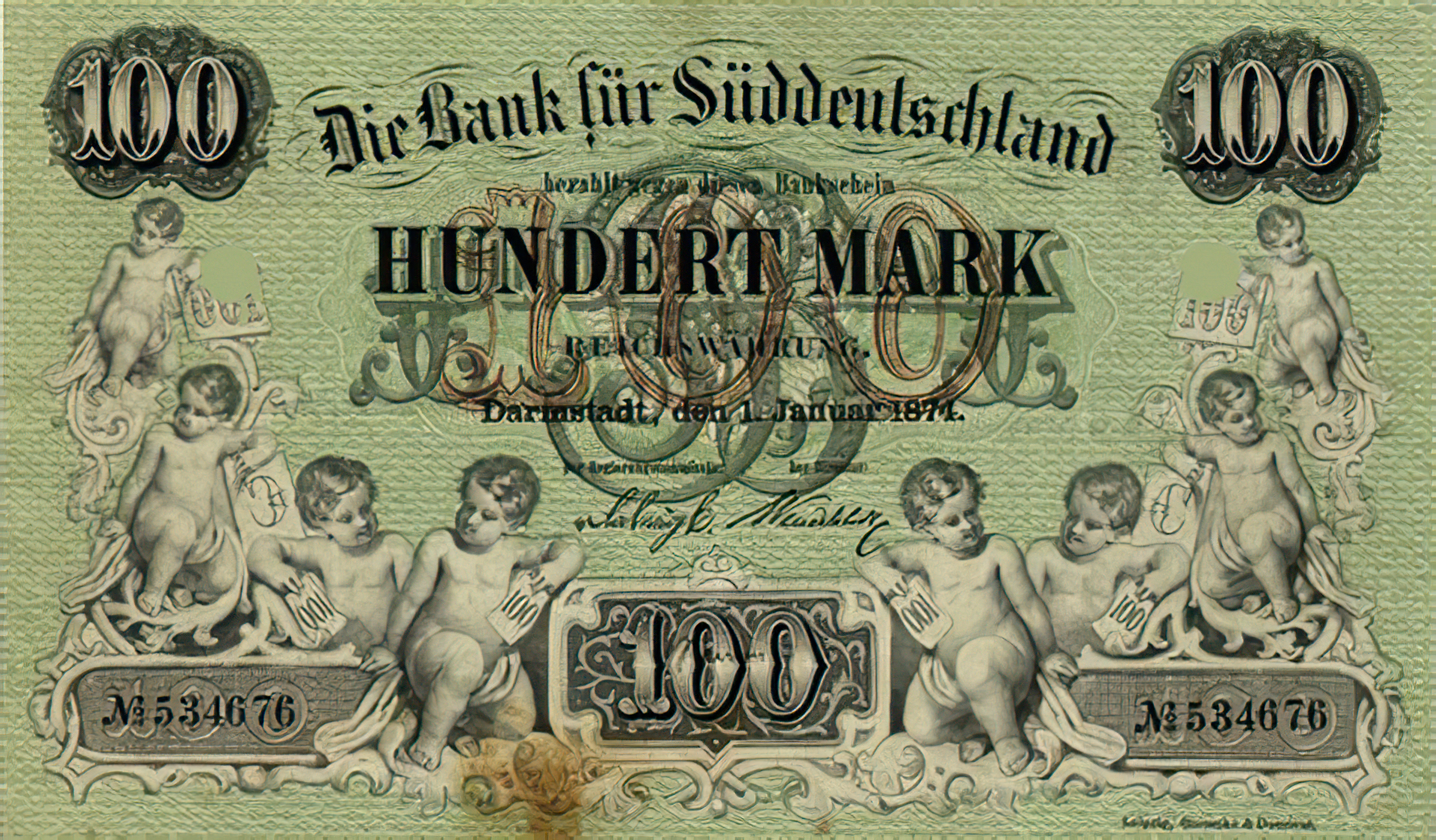
100 mark bank note from the Bank für Süddeutschland, 1875

In 1803, following secularisation and mediatisation, the Final recess and the Treaty of the Confederation of the Rhine removed the minting rights of the states that had been abolished. In the Hessian region, the right to mint was lost by the Diocese of Fulda, the noble houses of Isenburg, Solms, and Erbach, and the city of Friedberg. The last coins of the city of Friedberg were minted in late summer 1806 (although the grand duchy had annexed the city in 1804). Henceforth, only the grand duchy had the right to mint coinage within its territory and the only mint was the one at Darmstadt. This mint also produced coinage for the Duchy of Nassau and for Hesse-Homburg.

The grand duchy was a member of the South German monetary union and minted guilder and kreuzer coins. As a result of the Dresden Coinage Convention, the exchange rate of these coins was pegged to the North German thaler. The grand duchy of Hesse also minted double thaler coins from 1839 and Vereinsthaler from 1857.

Under the law of 30 July 1848, the grand duchy's debt payments were made with banknotes called "Ground rent certificates". According to this law, notes were issued in 1848 in denominations of 1, 5, and 10 guilder, and in denominations of 35 and 70 guilder in 1849. However, forgeries of these notes were created in Philadelphia and brought into circulation in Hesse, leading to a new emission of paper money in 1864, consisting of over 4.3 million guiler (law of 26 April 1864). In addition, the Bank für Süddeutschland received a concession from the grand duchy in 1855, allowing it to operate as a private coining bank.

In 1874/5, the Hessian coinage was replaced by the mark, the new unified currency of the entire German Empire. The mint at Darmstadt produced the new coinage with the mint mark "H" until 1882.

=== Weights and measures ===
Until 1818, there were a large number of different systems of weights and measures in the individual components of the grand duchy. The ell alone had forty different definitions and there were several hundred definitions of the rod. This led to very many different measures of area. Sometimes there were different systems of measurement for different professions, such as bakers and butchers.

Christian Eckhardt was tasked with designing a unified national system for the whole grand duchy. This new system was implemented on 1 July 1818. Instead of introducing the modern, French metric system, which had already been used in Rhine-Hesse province during its occupation by France, a compromise was devised. Eckhardt was principally concerned that the population would not use the reformed system in their day-to-day lives. He also thought that the decimal system used by metric measurements resulted in units that were not sufficiently far apart for day-to-day use. The compromise was as follows: the foot (Fuß) and inch (Zoll) were retained, but the foot was defined as exactly a quarter of 1 metre (i.e. 25 cm). This new foot was divided into 12 inches, so each inch was roughly equivalent to 2 cm. All the other units of volume and weight were then derived from this measurement, as in the metric system:

- 2.5 inches^{3} = 15.625 cubic-inches (Kubikzoll) was the basic equation for volume measurements.
- 1 cubic-inch of water therefore weighed 15.625 g = 1 loth, the basic unit of weight.
  - 32 loth = 1 Pound (Pfund) = 500 g
  - 100 pounds = 1 Hundredweight (Zentner)
  - 32 cubic-inches = 1 Hessischer Pint glass = ½ Liter

There were exceptions to this general system for medicines, precious metals, and jewels.

The system was implemented by a number of legal regulations:

- The Ordinance on the new weights and measures in the Grand Duchy of Hesse, 10 December 1819 introduced the measures of length, area, volume, and weight and established a unified system in the grand duchy
- A series of technical ordinances followed.
- Further subsequent ordinances regulated details and resolved questions that had arisen in practice.

In der Praxis setzte sich das neue System – trotz seines Kompromisscharakters – nur langsam durch und die Obrigkeit musste weitere Zugeständnisse machen. Mit dem Gesetz, die Anwendung des neuen Maß- und Gewichtssystems betreffend vom 3. Juni 1821 wurde es Privatleuten, die kein Gewerbe oder keinen Handel betrieben, freigestellt, jedes beliebige Maßsystem zu verwenden (also auch die althergebrachten Einheiten).

On 17 August 1868, the North German Confederation published a new ordinance on weights and measures, which came into force on 1 January 1872 and introduced the metric system. Only one of the three provinces of the grand duchy was part of the North German Confederation (Upper Hesse), but to avoid the grand duchy being divided into two regions with different systems, a law was passed introducing the metric system throughout the grand duchy.

=== Corporations ===
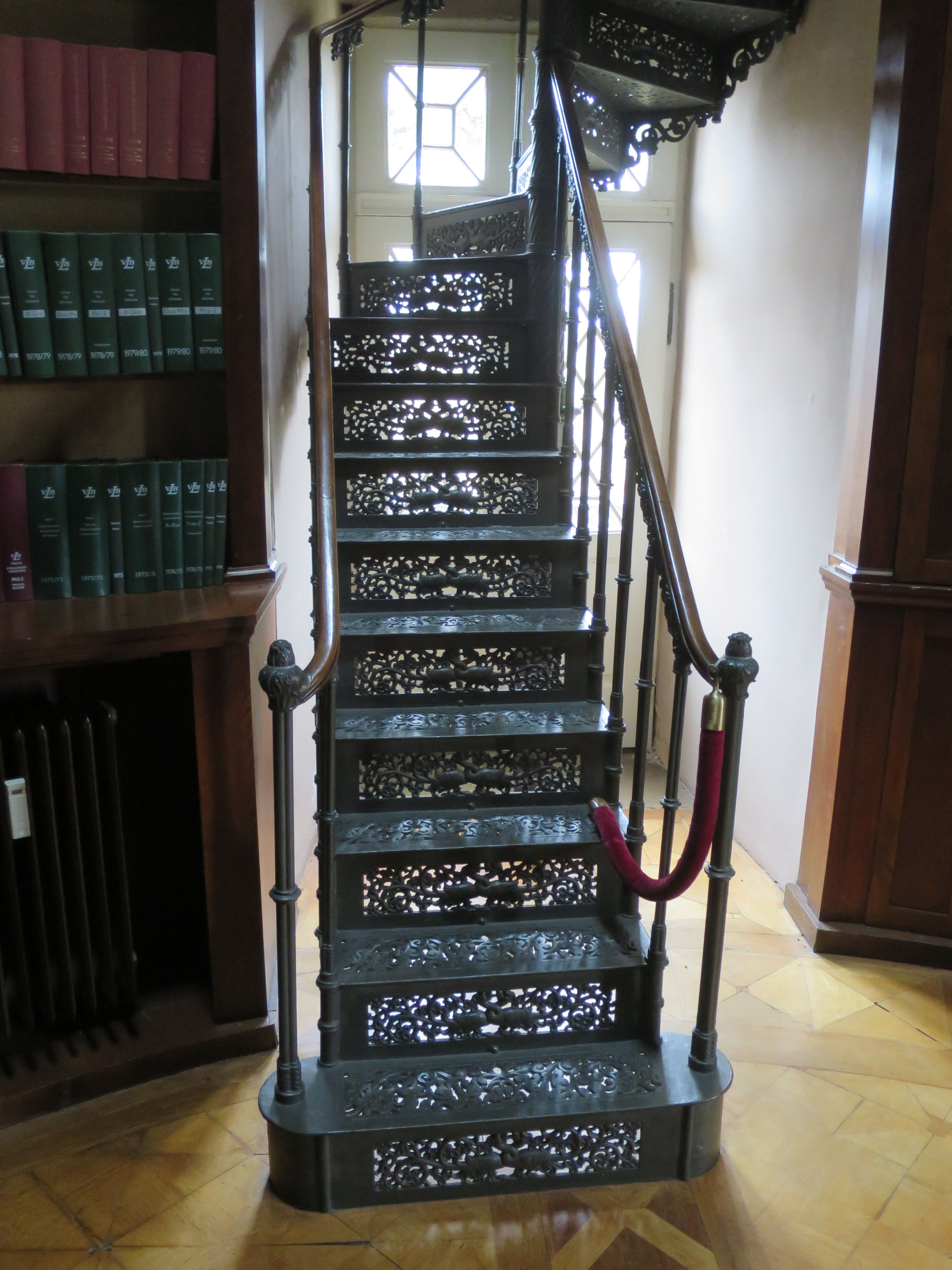
Cast iron stairs in the library of Herrnsheimer Schloss, originally displayed in the First German Industrial Exhibition at Mainz in 1842

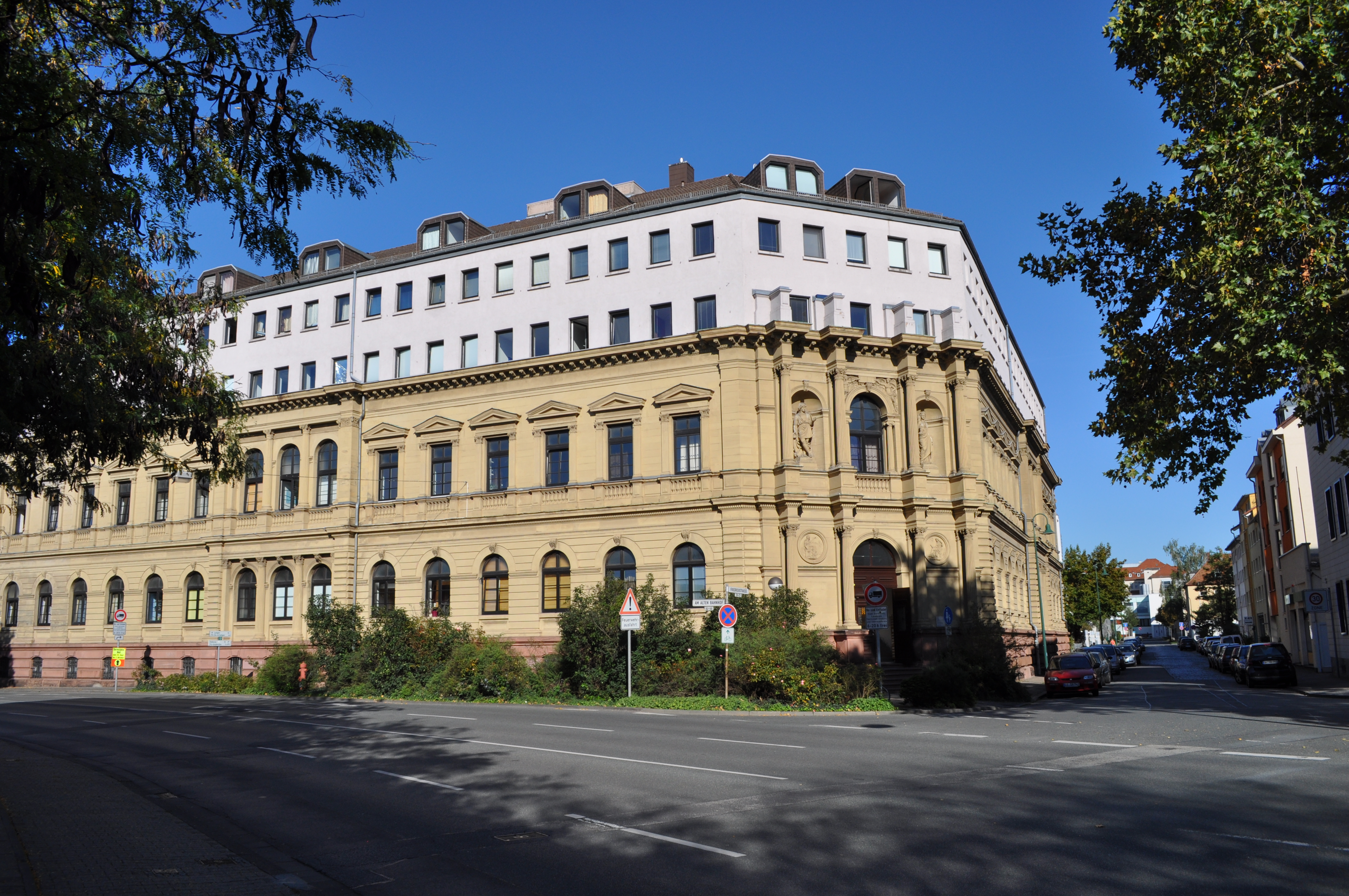
Former headquarters of the Darmstadt Bank in Darmstadt

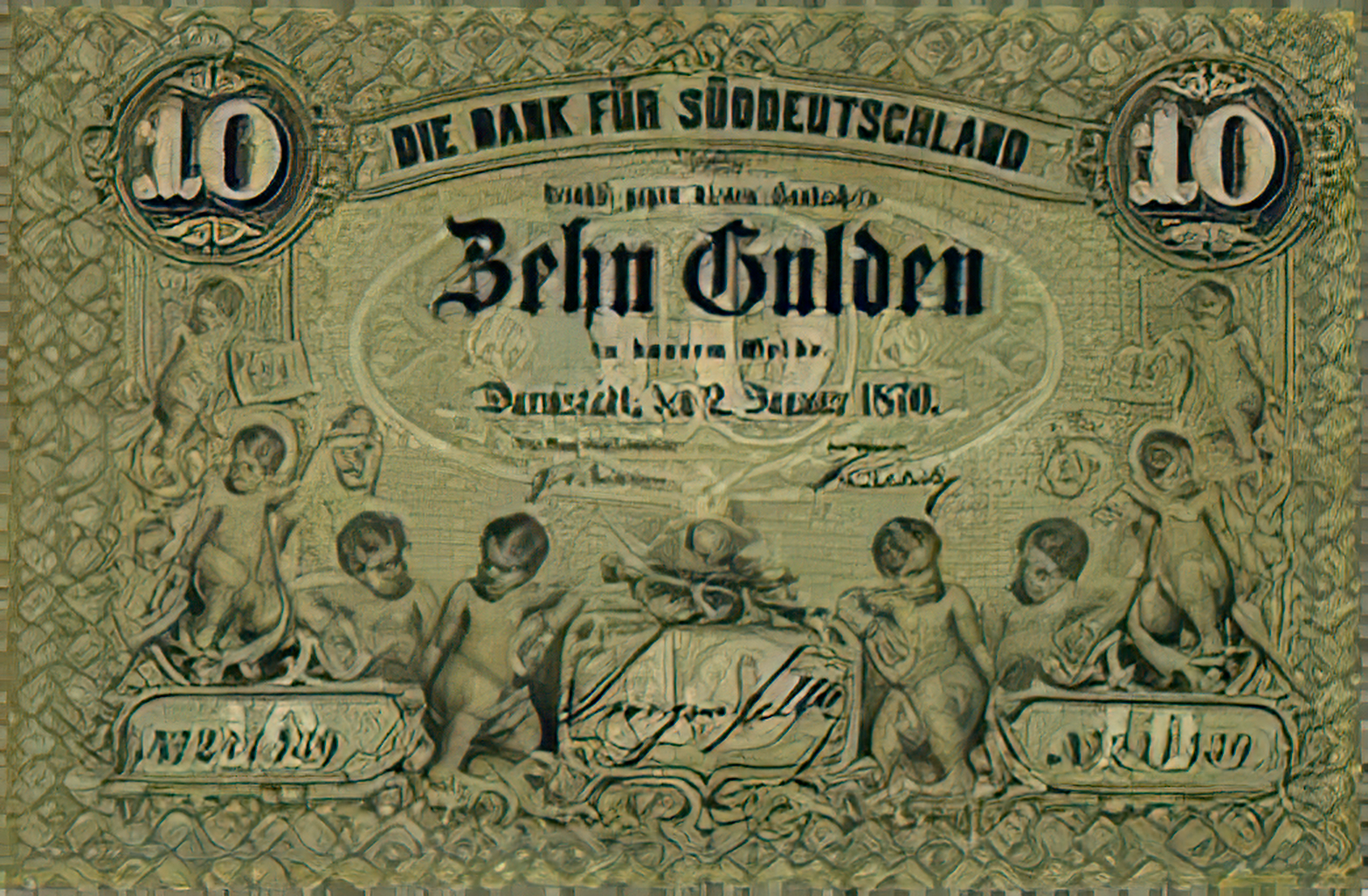
10 guilder bank note from the Bank für Süddeutschland, 1870

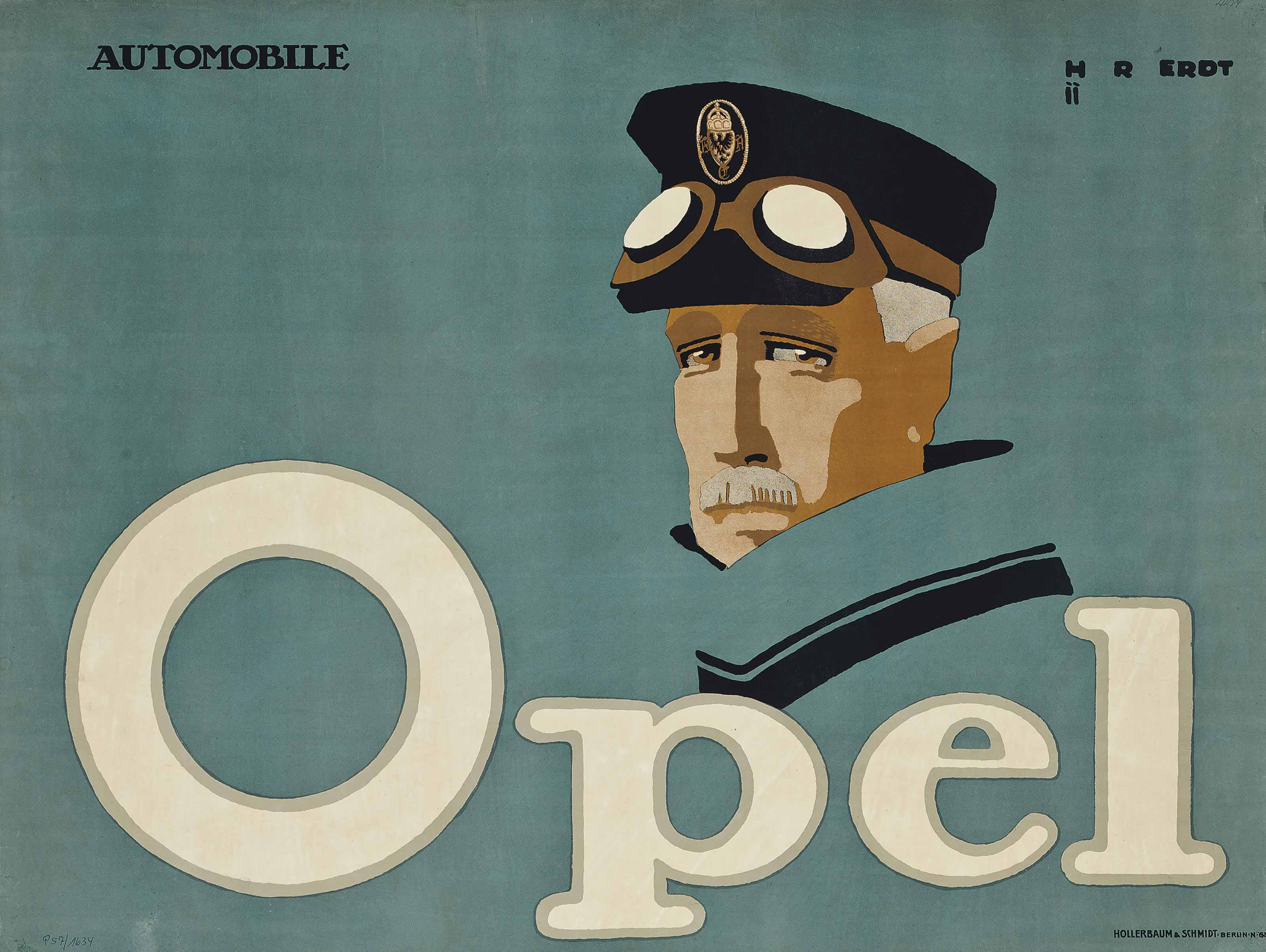
Opel-Werbung, 1911

A number of companies with global reach were founded in the Grand Duchy of Hesse, with the support of the Hessian Chamber of Commerce. In 1842, the First German Industrial Exhibition took place in Mainz. However, industrialisation occurred relatively late and was relatively restrained. In 1847 there were 24 steam engines in the grand duchy; in 1854 there were 83, and in 1862 there were 240, with a total combined strength of only 2,227 horse power. One of the most important "industries" of the state was the production of cigarettes, with around two hundred workshops. At the Great Exhibition in London in 1851, 74 companies from the grand duchy were present, and at the 1862 International Exhibition, also in London, there were a hundred Hessian companies. In 1908, the air transport pioneer, August Euler built a workshop at the edge of Darmstadt's firing range which became Griesheim Airport. The biplane built there was a notable exhibit at the International Aeronautical Exhibition at Frankfurt the following year.

Key businesses in the grand duchy included:

- Darmstadt
  - E. Merck (chemicals and pharmaceuticals)
  - Machine manufacturing and iron casting
  - Darmstadt Bank, founded in 1853, which played a key role in financing the construction of railroads and other infrastructure.
  - Bank for South Germany, which printed bank notes until 1902.

The presence of the two banks in Darmstadt meant that the grand duchy had fewer restrictions on public companies for poor financial performance, since the banks could act more freely than in neighbouring Frankfurt or Prussia.

- Mainz remained a leading producer of luxury goods, furniture, varnish, lacquer and leather, as it had been when it was the capital of the Electorate of Mainz
  - Werner & Mertz (Erdal shoe polish)
  - Kupferberg (sekt wine producer)
  - Verlag Philipp von Zabern (publisher)
  - Lackfrabrik Ludwig Marx (leather)
  - Bembé (parquetry)
- Mombach
  - Verein für Chemische Industrie, now Prefere Paraform (acetic acids and methylated products)
  - Waggonfabrik Gebrüder Gastell (railway cars and automobiles)
- Offenbach am Main was known for its leather production and "Offenbach leather" remains famous today. The city was also a centre for the production of aniline and alizarin synthetic dyes.
- Oppenheim
  - Pharmaceutical companies of Friedrich Koch, producing quinine.
- Rüsselsheim
  - Opel, sewing machines from 1862, automobiles from 1899.
- Worms
  - Lederwerke Cornelius Heyl AG (leather)
  - Lederwerke Doerr & Reinhart
  - Soluble glass production

Gasworks proved a great advance, particularly for street lighting. The first gasworks in the grand duchy was opened in Mainz in 1853. It was followed by another at Darmstadt in 1855 on 14 March, celebrated by specially lighting up the opera house, and a third at Giessen in 1856.

=== Transport and communications ===
==== Communications ====
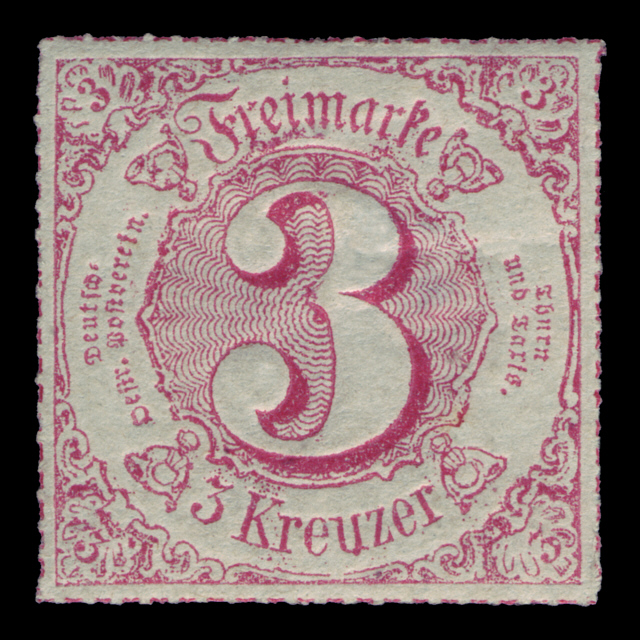
Stamp of the Thurn-und-Taxis Post

The right to manage the postal service was granted to Prince Karl Alexander von Thurn und Taxis in 1807. Until 1867, Thurn-und-Taxis Post held a monopoly on postal services within the grand duchy. The state was responsible for an administrative office, tariffs, and post roads. The post offices bore the name "Grand Ducal Hessian Post Office of..."

Around 1850, the grand duchy was connected up to the newly developed international telegraph network. In 1852, the telegraph line running along the Rhine-Neckar Railroad was made available for private telegraph messages and in 1853 a separate "telegraph office" was opened in Darmstadt.

During the 1890s, the telephone network was expanded, from less than 800 to 7,260 km (500 to 4,510 mi) and the number of telephones connected to the network rose from 755 to 4267.

==== Street vehicles ====
In the period before the arrival of the railroads, the construction of a road network was an important task, in order to bind the different parts of the grand duchy together. In pursuit of this, an expropriation law was passed in 1821, based on article 27 of the constitution. After the conclusion of the customs union with Prussia in 1830, there were further laws on the construction and maintenance of "national roads" (Staatskunststraßen) and provincial roads. Important road links built at this time include:

- Darmstadt–Dieburg, Starkenburg Province (now the L 3094)
- Reinheim–Michelstadt–Obernburg, Starkenburg Province, in 1820
- Hirschhorn–Beerfelden, Starkenburg Province in 1822 (now the L 3119)
- Mainz–Worms (Gaustraße), Rhine-Hesse Province (now the L 425 and 439)

Vehicle registration plates for the grand duchy started with "V" (i.e. the Roman numeral for 5), followed by the first letter of the individual province, so the plate of a car registered in Rhine-Hesse province would begin "VR". The plates had black letters on a white background. These plates continued in use until 1945.

The first "Automobile post line" of the Reichspost was opened in 1906, between Friedberg and Ranstadt.

==== Rhine shipping ====
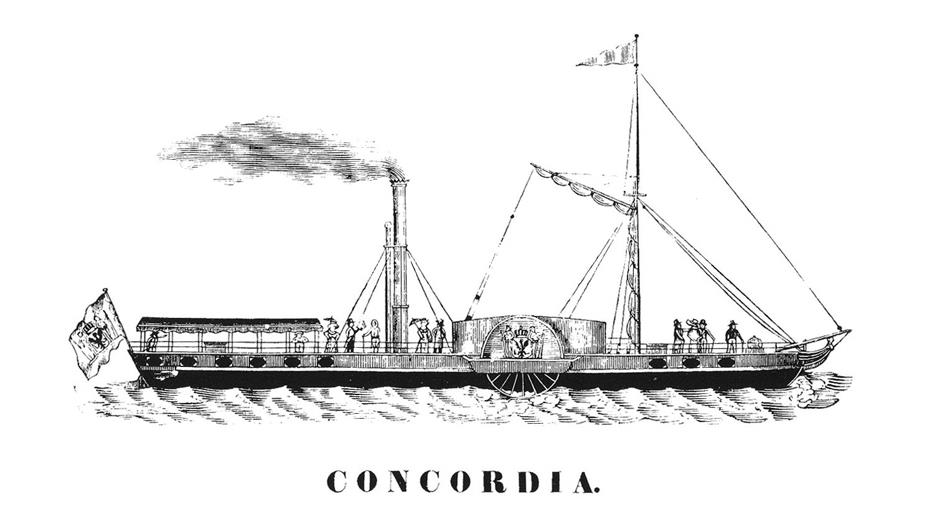
Rhine steamer Concordia c. 1830

Before railroads, the Rhine was the most important transportation route in the grand duchy. The French occupiers in the Napoleonic period had given it a central administration which was based in Mainz. At the Congress of Vienna in 1815, these tasks were given to a new organisation, also based in Mainz, called the Central Commission for Navigation on the Rhine. It took until 1821 for the members of this organisation to agree to a new system of shipping regulations.

New regulations were all the more urgent because this was the time when the first steamboats began to travel on the Rhine. In 1828, the Cologne steamboat company transported 18,600 passengers on the Rhine. In 1826, the grand duchy granted a concession for a "Steamboat company of the Rhine and Main" and from 1828, the steamboat Stadt Frankfurt travelled between Frankfurt and Mainz.

==== Railways ====
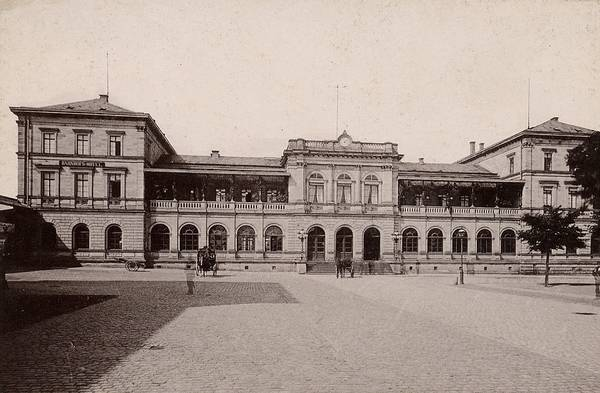
Main station of the Hessian Ludwig Railway in Darmstadt (1875–1912).

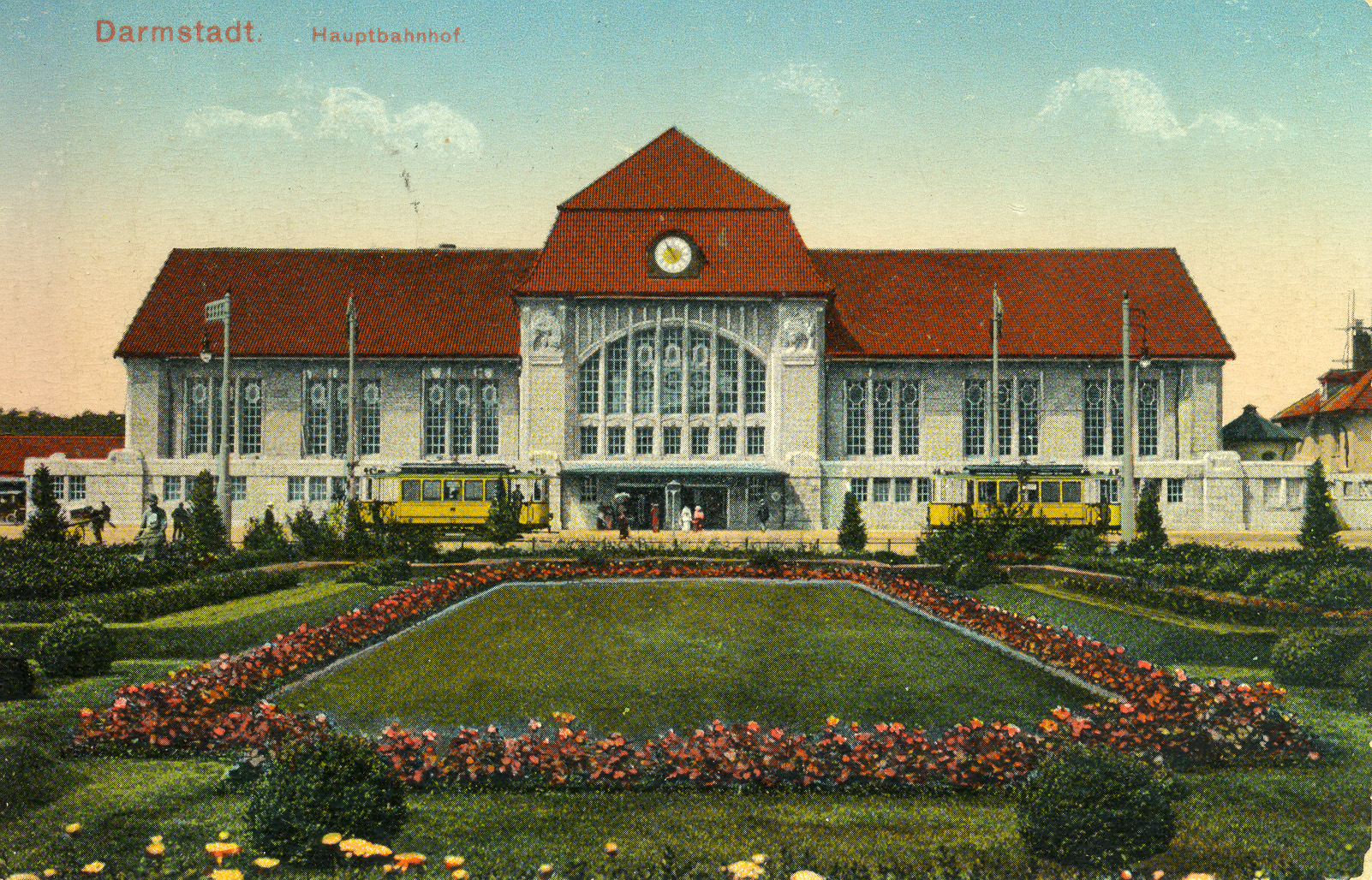
New Darmstadt Hauptbahnhof (Darmstadt main station), opened 1912).

Business headquarters of the Hessian Ludwig Railway and the Prussian-Hessian Railway Company, in Mainz.

In 1836, only half a year after the establishment of the first railway in Germany, the grand duchy's parliament passed a law, which enabled the expropriation of land for private companies building railroads.

The first private initiative for the construction of a railroad network, which was to include a Frankfurt–Darmstadt–Heidelberg line and a branch line to Mainz, failed in 1838, when the company undertaking the project could not raise sufficient capital. The state refused to invest in the project. The grand duchy had no real railway policy. Later on, it invested in individual projects with a half stake or even on it own, without any overarching plan. Thus, the first railway connection in the grand duchy, the extension of the Taunus Railway to Mainz-Kastel station in 1840, was a project of the neighbouring states that just happened to pass into the grand duchy.

The province of Starkenburg received a central railway connection, the Main-Neckar Railway, early on and the province of Upper Hesse was connected up by the Main-Weser Railway fairly early. This links were the product of joint railway projects with its neighbouring states:

- Main-Neckar Railway with Frankfurt and Baden
- Main-Weser Railway with Frankfurt and the Electorate of Hesse
- Frankfurt-Offenbach Local Railway with the Free City of Frankfurt

Meanwhile, the construction of a railway in the third province, Rhine Hesse, was undertaken by a private company, the Hessian Ludwig Railway, which developed into one of largest private railways in Germany. It maintained a thick network of lines in Rhine-Hesse, Starkenburg, and beyond. Their original line, the Mainz-Worms(-Ludwigshafen) railway, linked the railway network of the grand duchy to France from 1853. This was a boon for the grand duchy's export market. Finally, in 1876 the state founded its own company, the Grand Duchy of Hesse State Railways, which continued to expand the network into Upper Hesse. In 1897, the Hessian Ludwig Railway was nationalised, merged with the Grand Duchy of Hesse State Railways, and then both were placed under the control of the Prussian-Hessian Railway Company (a subsidiary of the Prussian state railways, which had its headquarters in Mainz). The Main-Neckar Railway followed in 1902. From this point, the vast majority of most of the grand duchy's railway network was under the Prussian-Hessian Railway Company.

Overview of the Hessian railway network in 1889

Railway company	km	%	Establishment	Company closed	Notes
Hessian Ludwig Railway	507	55	1853	1897	Private railway, nationalised and transferred to the Prussian-Hessian Railway Company in 1897.
Grand Duchy of Hesse State Railways	183	20	1876	1897	Control transferred to the Prussian-Hessian Railway Company in 1897.
Main-Neckar Railway	49	5	1843	1902	State railway (joint-ownership with Frankfurt and Baden). Control transferred to the Prussian-Hessian Railway Company in 1897.
Other	47	5	–	–	Various private railways
Grand Duchy of Baden State Railway	22	2	1840	1920	
Prussian state railways	111	12	1850	1920	Main-Weser Railway (co-owned by Hesse-Darmstadt, Frankfurt, and Hesse-Kessel, 1849–1869); Frankfurt-Offenbach Local Railway (co-owned by Hesse-Darmstadt and Frankfurt, 1848–1869); Hanau-Frankfurt Railway and Friedberg–Hanau railway (sections).
Total	919	100	–		

The highest authority over the railroads in the grand duchy was the Finance Ministry, which had a railroad office from 1891.

== Culture ==
=== Architecture ===
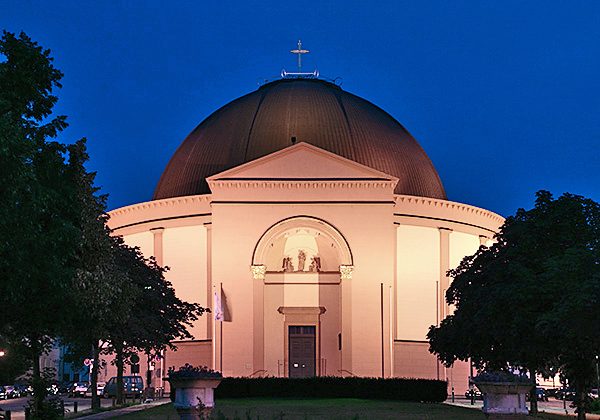
St.-Ludwigs-Kirche in Darmstadt by Georg Moller

Georg Moller (1784–1852), a leading architect and city planner became the grand duchy's manager of works in 1810 and was responsible for a series of public buildings: St Ludwig's Church (the first Catholic church in Darmstadt since the Reformation), the National Theatre, Luisenplatz, Darmstadt with the Ludwig Column, the mausoleum in the Rosenhöhe Park, and the masonic lodge (now known as the 'Moller House'). Outside Darmstadt, he was responsible for the Staatstheater Mainz and the restoration of Schloss Biedenkopf.

=== Heritage management ===
Carolingian Torhalle (gatehouse) at Lorsch Abbey

Under the first and last grand dukes, there was a significant effort at heritage protection. At the instigation of Georg Moller, a heritage management regulation was brought into effect in the grand duchy on 22 January 1818, which dealt with care for buildings and archaeological remains and was a precursor of modern heritage protection laws. Among other things Moller was responsible for the preservation of the Carolingian Torhalle (gatehouse) at Lorsch Abbey, which is now a UNESCO World Heritage Site.

The grand duchy's "Law on Cultural Heritage Management" of 16 July 1902 was the first modern, codified heritage management law in Germany. This became the model for similar laws outside the grand duchy and remained in effect until 1986.

=== Jugendstil ===
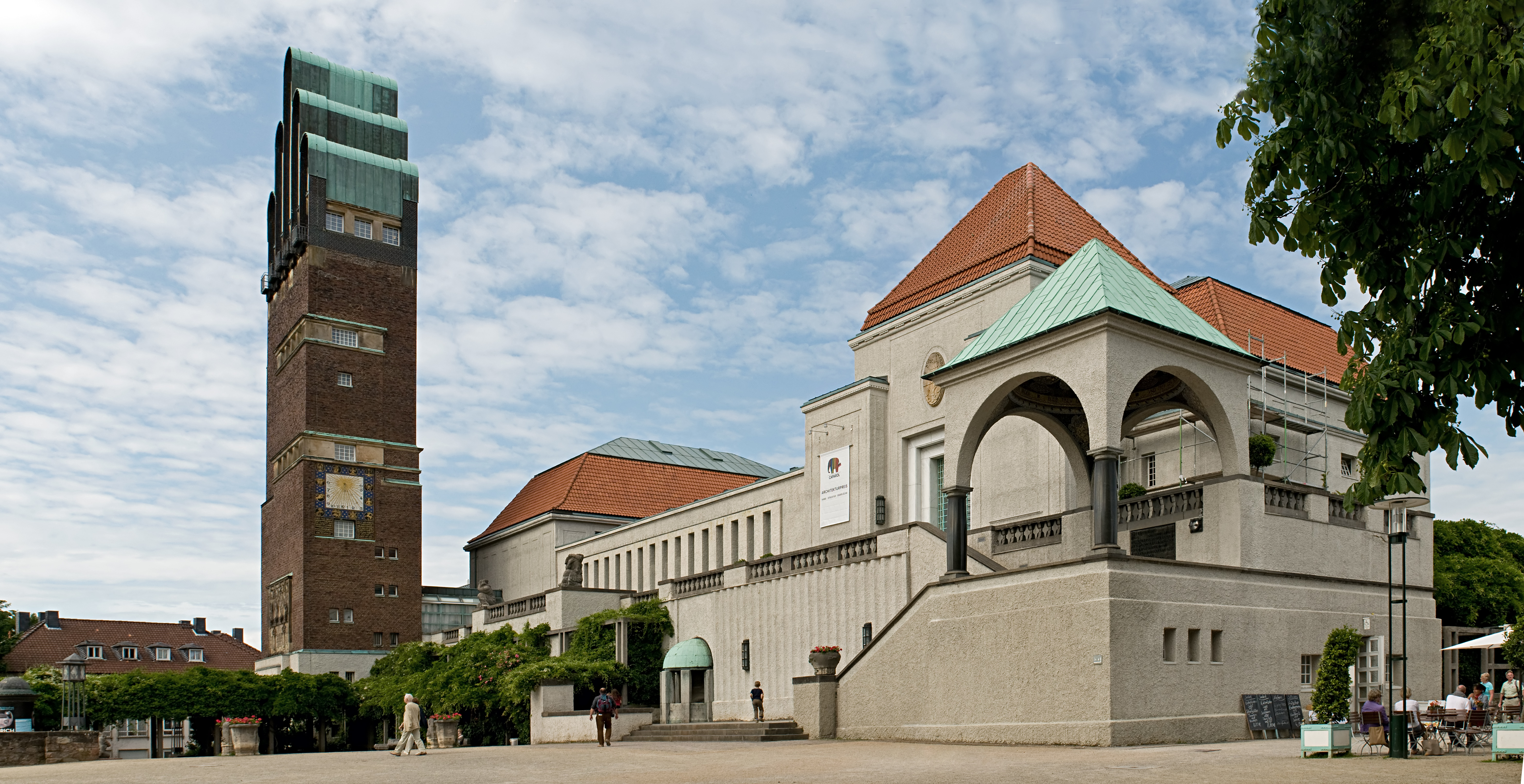
Wedding tower and exhibition hall at Mathildenhöhe in Darmstadt

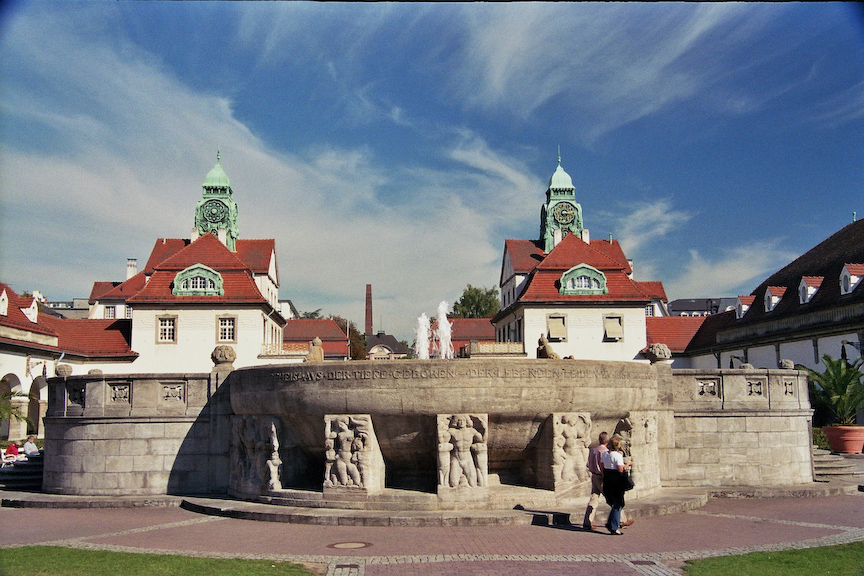
Sprudelhof in Bad Nauheim

Grand Duke Ernest Louis was a great supporter of the arts and, unlike most other German monarchs, also of modern art, especially the Judendstil (Art Nouveau). As a grandson of Queen Victoria, he had become familiar with the Arts and Crafts Movement during his visits to England. In 1899, he invited seven young artists to form the Artists' Colony. He had the architect Joseph Maria Olbrich design a workshop at Mathildenhöhe and also allowed the artists to design their own houses. In addition to Olbrich, members of the colony included Peter Behrens, Hans Christiansen, and Ludwig Habich. Between 1901 and 1914, four exhibitions of Jugendstil art took place at Mathildenhöhe. In Bad Nauheim, a unique collection of spa facilities, mostly designed by these artists, was created: Sprudelhof, drinking water fountains, bath houses, parks, pumps, and a laundry. The whole structure still exists today, providing an extraordinary ensemble of the artistic and architectural style of the grand duchy in 1910.

=== Language ===
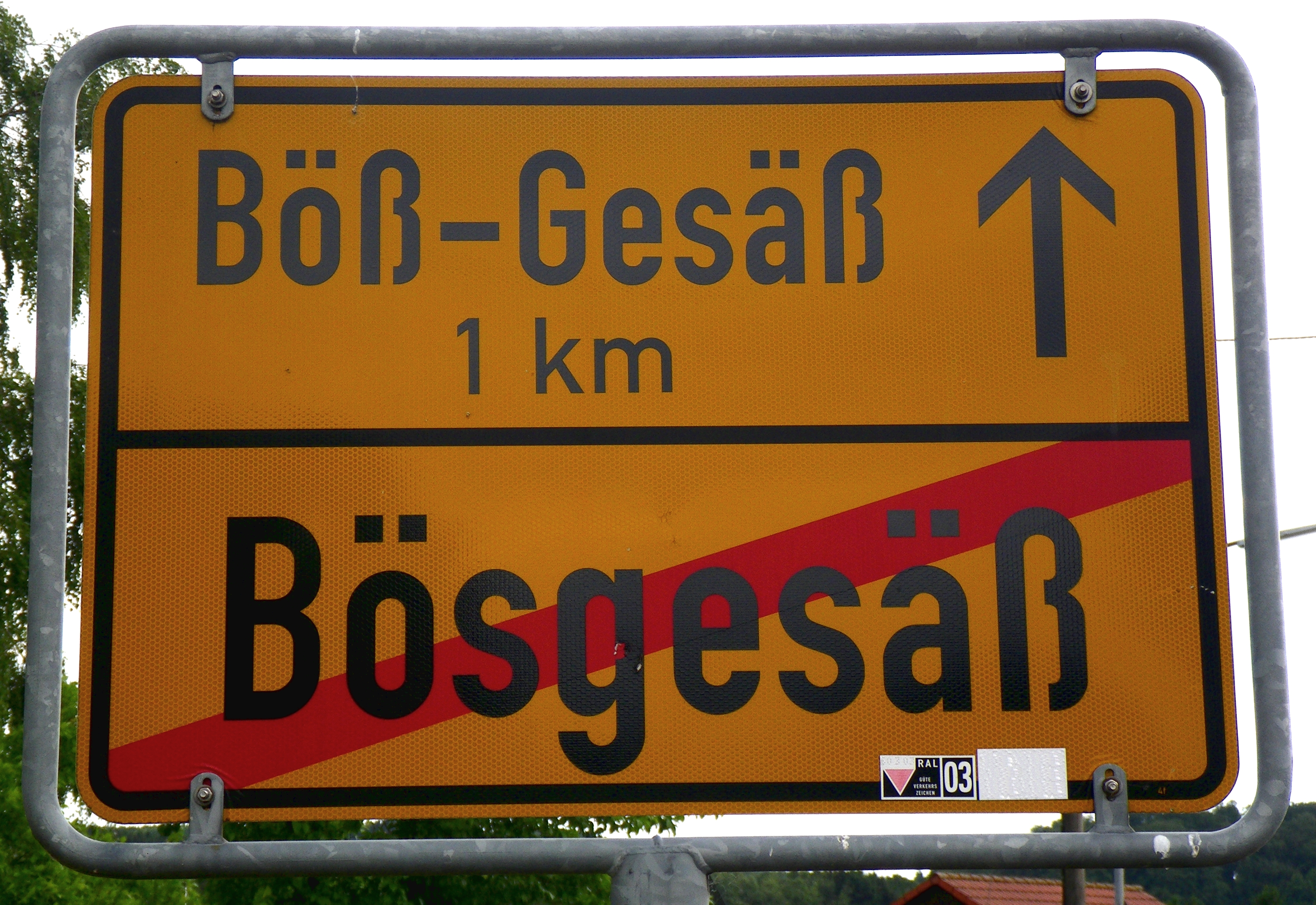
The "Rechtschreibgrenze" ("Correct Spelling Boundary"): traffic sign leaving "Preußisch-Bösgesäß" and stating that Hessisch-Bös-Gesäß is 1 km away

Until the beginning of the 20th century, the grand duchy retained different spelling rules from the neighbouring states of Prussian and Bavaria, which continues to have an impact today. This system meant that compound place names in the grand duchy were written with a hyphen, unlike standard German. Examples of this can still be seen in places that once fell within the boundaries of the grand duchy. A standardised spelling system for all Prussian official purposes was introduced on 1 January 1903 by the Prussian Ministry of Culture, Education, and Health. Since the rules of the Prussian state railways applied to the Prussian-Hessian Railway Company, compound place names in the names of railway stations were written without the hyphen, even though the name of the place that they served was written with one, as with Groß Gerau station in Groß-Gerau and Hohensülzen station in Hohen-Sülzen.

== See also ==
- List of rulers of Hesse
- Hessenlager

== Bibliography ==
- Brand, Ulrich. Verordnungen und Gesetzestexte zum Maß- und Gewichtswesen im Großherzogtum Hessen-Darmstadt. 1817–1870. Verein für Geschichte, Denkmal- und Landschaftspflege e. V. Bad Ems, Bad Ems o. J. ISSN 1436-4603.
- Cosack, Konrad (1894). Das Staatsrecht des Großherzogthums Hessen. Mohr, Freiburg, and Leipzig.
- Ewald, L. (1862). "Beiträge zur Landeskunde". In Grossherzogliche Centralstelle für die Landes-Statistik (ed.). Beiträge zur Statistik des Grossherzogthums Hessen. Darmstadt: Jonghaus.
- Franz, Eckhart G. (1976). "Einleitung". In Ruppel, Hans Georg; Müller, Karin (eds.). Historisches Ortsverzeichnis für das Gebiet des ehem. Großherzogtums und Volksstaats Hessen: Darmstädter Archivschriften 2. Darmstadt: Historischer Verein für Hessen.
- Franz, Eckhart G.; Fleck, Peter; Kallenberg, Fritz (2003). "Großherzogtum Hessen (1800) 1806–1918". In Heinemeyer, Walter; Berding, Helmut; Moraw, Peter; Philippi, Hans (eds.). Handbuch der Hessischen Geschichte. Vol. 4.2: Hessen im Deutschen Bund und im neuen Deutschen Reich (1806) 1815–1945. Die hessischen Staaten bis 1945. Marburg: Elwert. ISBN 3-7708-1238-7.
- Hessisches Landesamt für Geschichtliche Landeskunde, Geschichtlicher Atlas von Hessen. Marburg 1960–1978.
- Karenberg, Dagobert (1964). Die Entwicklung der Verwaltung in Hessen-Darmstadt unter Ludewig I. (1790–1830). Darmstadt.
- Lange, Thomas (1993). Hessen-Darmstadts Beitrag für das heutige Hessen. Wiesbaden: Hessische Landeszentrale für Politische Bildung. ISBN 978-3-927127-12-8.
- von Mayer, Arthur (1891). Geschichte und Geographie der deutschen Eisenbahnen. Berlin: Wilhelm Baensch.
- Polley, Rainer (2010). "Recht und Verfassung". In Speitkamp, Winifried (ed.). Handbuch der hessischen Geschichte 1: Bevölkerung, Wirtschaft und Staat in Hessen 1806 – 1945. Marburg: Historischen Kommission für Hessen. pp. 335–371. ISBN 978-3-942225-01-4.
- Reuling, Ulrich (1984). "Verwaltungs-Einteilung 1821–1955. Mit einem Anhang über die Verwaltungsgebietsreform in Hessen 1968–1981". In Schwind, Fred (ed.). Geschichtlicher Atlas von Hessen : Text- und Erläuterungsband. Sigmaringen: Thorbecke. ISBN 3-921254-95-7.
- Reus, Heribert (1984). Gerichte und Gerichtsbezirke seit etwa 1816/1822 im Gebiete des heutigen Landes Hessen bis zum 1. Juli 1968. Wiesbaden: Hessisches Ministerium der Justiz.
- Ruppel, Hans Georg; Müller, Karin (1976). Historisches Ortsverzeichnis für das Gebiet des ehem. Großherzogtums und Volksstaats Hessen. Darmstadt: Historischer Verein für Hessen.
- Schmahl, Helmut (2000). Verpflanzt, aber nicht entwurzelt: Die Auswanderung aus Hessen-Darmstadt (Provinz Rheinhessen) nach Wisconsin im 19. Jahrhundert. Frankfurt am Main.
- Schmidt, Arthur Benno (1893). Die geschichtlichen Grundlagen des bürgerlichen Rechts im Großherzogtum Hessen. Giessen: Curt von Münchow.
- Schmitt, Hans A. (1983). "Germany Without Prussia: a Closer Look at the Confederation of the Rhine". German Studies Review. 6 (4): 9–39. doi:10.2307/1429433. JSTOR 1429433.
- Wagner, Georg Wilhelm Justin (1829–1831). Allgemeine Statistik des Grossherzogthums Hessen. Darmstadt: C. W. Leske.
  - Vol. 1: Provinz Starkenburg
  - Vol. 4: Statistik des Ganzen (Digitised by HathiTrust)
- Werner, Ferdinand (2012). Arbeitersiedlungen: Arbeiterhäuser im Rhein-Neckar-Raum. Worms: Wernersche Verlagsgesellschaft. ISBN 978-3-88462-330-5.
