= Organic synthesis =

Chemical construction of organic compounds

Organic synthesis is a branch of chemical synthesis concerned with the construction of organic compounds. Organic compounds are molecules consisting of combinations of covalently-linked hydrogen, carbon, oxygen, and nitrogen atoms. Within the general subject of organic synthesis, there are many different types of synthetic routes that can be completed including total synthesis, stereoselective synthesis, automated synthesis, and many more.

== Total synthesis ==
A total synthesis refers to the complete chemical synthesis of molecules from simple, natural precursors. Total synthesis is accomplished either via a linear or convergent approach. In a linear synthesis—often adequate for simple structures—several steps are performed sequentially until the molecule is complete; the chemical compounds made in each step are called synthetic intermediates. Most often, each step in a synthesis is a separate reaction taking place to modify the starting materials. For more complex molecules, a convergent synthetic approach may be better suited. This type of reaction scheme involves the individual preparations of several key intermediates, which are then combined to form the desired product.

Robert Burns Woodward, who received the 1965 Nobel Prize for Chemistry for several total syntheses including his synthesis of strychnine, is regarded as the grandfather of modern organic synthesis. Some latter-day examples of syntheses include Wender's, Holton's, Nicolaou's, and Danishefsky's total syntheses of the anti-cancer drug paclitaxel (trade name Taxol).

== Methodology and applications ==
Understanding the chemical reactions, reagents, and conditions required in each step to guarantee successful product yield is essential for organic synthesis. When determining optimal reaction conditions for a given synthesis, the goal is to produce an adequate yield of pure product with as few steps as possible. When deciding conditions for a reaction, the literature can offer examples of previous reaction conditions that can be repeated, or a new synthetic route can be developed and tested. For practical, industrial applications additional reaction conditions must be considered to include the safety of both the researchers and the environment, as well as product purity.

== Synthetic techniques ==
Organic synthesis may require many steps to separate and purify products after performing one or more chemical reactions. Depending on the chemical state of the product to be isolated, different techniques are required. For liquid products, a very common separation technique is liquid–liquid extraction and for solid products, filtration (gravity or vacuum) can be used.

=== Liquid–liquid extraction ===
Liquid liquid extraction

Liquid–liquid extraction uses the density and polarity of the product and solvents to perform a separation. Based on the concept of "like-dissolves-like", non-polar compounds are more soluble in non-polar solvents, and polar compounds are more soluble in polar solvents. By using this concept, the relative solubility of compounds can be exploited by adding immiscible solvents into the same flask and separating the product into the solvent with the most similar polarity. Solvent miscibility is of major importance as it allows for the formation of two layers in the flask, one layer containing the side reaction material and one containing the product. As a result of the differing densities of the layers, the product-containing layer can be isolated and the other layer can be removed.

=== Heated reactions and reflux condensers ===
Reflux apparatus

Many reactions require heat to increase reaction speed. However, in many situations increased heat can cause the solvent to boil uncontrollably which negatively affects the reaction, and can potentially reduce product yield. To address this issue, reflux condensers can be fitted to reaction glassware. Reflux condensers are specially designed pieces of glassware that possess two inlets for water to run in and out through the glass against gravity. This flow of water cools any escaping substrate and condenses it back into the reaction flask to continue reacting and ensure that all product is contained. The use of reflux condensers is an important technique within organic syntheses and is utilized in reflux steps, as well as recrystallization steps.

When being used for refluxing a solution, reflux condensers are fitted and closely observed. Reflux occurs when condensation can be seen dripping back into the reaction flask from the reflux condenser; 1 drop every second or few seconds.

For recrystallization, the product-containing solution is equipped with a condenser and brought to reflux again. Reflux is complete when the product-containing solution is clear. Once clear, the reaction is taken off heat and allowed to cool which will cause the product to re-precipitate, yielding a purer product.

=== Gravity and vacuum filtration ===
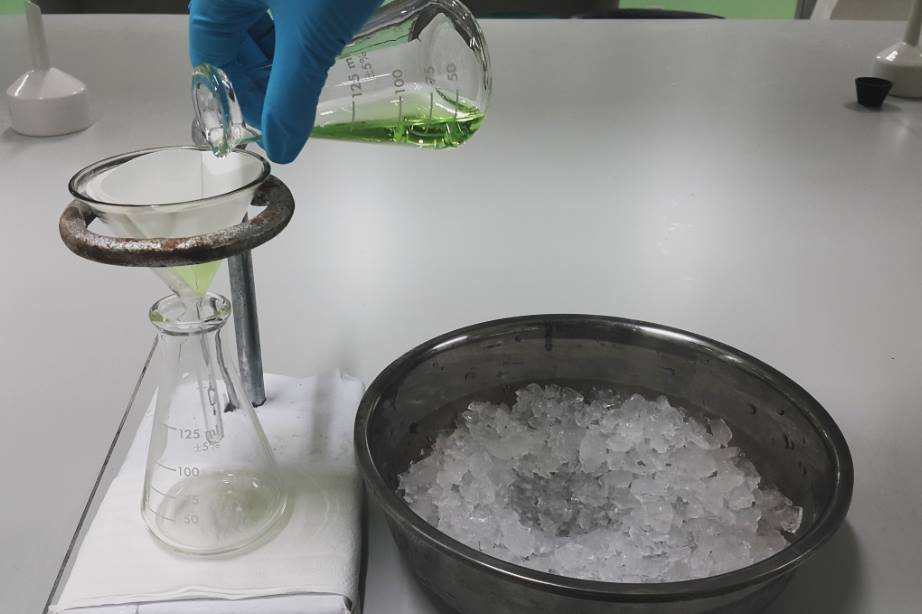
Gravity filtration apparatus

Solid products can be separated from a reaction mixture using filtration techniques. To obtain solid products a vacuum filtration apparatus can be used.

Vacuum filtration uses suction to pull liquid through a Büchner funnel equipped with filter paper, which catches the desired solid product. This process removes any unwanted solution in the reaction mixture by pulling it into the filtration flask and leaving the desired product to collect on the filter paper.

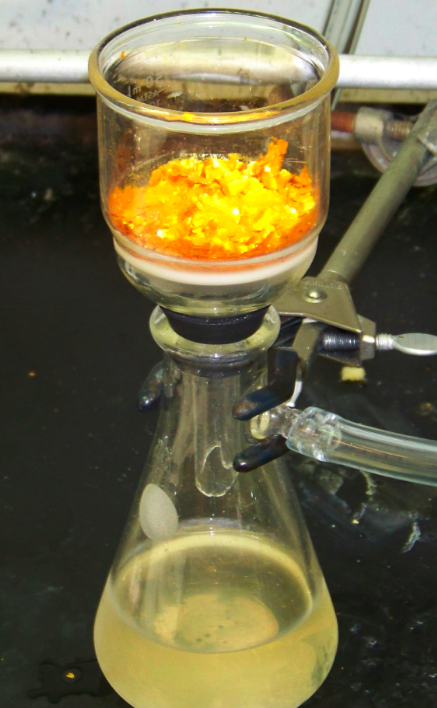
Vacuum filtration apparatus

Liquid products can also be separated from solids by using gravity filtration. In this separatory method, filter paper is folded into a funnel and placed on top of a reaction flask. The reaction mixture is then poured through the filter paper, at a rate such that the total volume of liquid in the funnel does not exceed the volume of the funnel. This method allows for the product to be separated from other reaction components by the force of gravity, instead of a vacuum.

== Stereoselective synthesis ==
Most complex natural products are chiral, and the bioactivity of chiral molecules varies with the enantiomer. Some total syntheses target racemic mixtures, which are mixtures of both possible enantiomers. A single enantiomer can then be selected via enantiomeric resolution.

As chemistry has developed methods of stereoselective catalysis and kinetic resolution have been introduced whereby reactions can be directed, producing only one enantiomer rather than a racemic mixture. Early examples include stereoselective hydrogenations (e.g., as reported by William Knowles and Ryōji Noyori) and functional group modifications such as the asymmetric epoxidation by Barry Sharpless; for these advancements in stereochemical preference, these chemists were awarded the Nobel Prize in Chemistry in 2001. Such preferential stereochemical reactions give chemists a much more diverse choice of enantiomerically pure materials.

Chemists have been able synthesize stereochemically selective complex molecules . Stereocontrol provides the target molecules to be synthesized as pure enantiomers (i.e., without need for resolution). Such techniques are referred to as stereoselective synthesis.

== Synthesis design ==
Many synthetic procedures are developed from a retrosynthetic framework, a type of synthetic design developed by Elias James Corey, for which he won the Nobel Prize in Chemistry in 1990. In this approach, the synthesis is planned backwards from the product, obliging to standard chemical rules. Each step breaks down the parent structure into achievable components, which are shown via the use of graphical schemes with retrosynthetic arrows (drawn as ⇒, which in effect, means "is made from"). Retrosynthesis allows for the visualization of desired synthetic designs.

=== Automated organic synthesis ===
A recent development within organic synthesis is automated synthesis. To conduct organic synthesis without human involvement, researchers are adapting existing synthetic methods and techniques to create entirely automated synthetic processes using organic synthesis software. This type of synthesis is advantageous as synthetic automation can increase yield with continual "flowing" reactions. In flow chemistry, substrates are continually fed into the reaction to produce a higher yield. Previously, this type of reaction was reserved for large-scale industrial chemistry but has recently transitioned to bench-scale chemistry to improve the efficiency of reactions on a smaller scale.

Currently integrating automated synthesis into their work is SRI International, a nonprofit research institute. Recently SRI International has developed Autosyn, an automated multi-step chemical synthesizer that can synthesize many FDA-approved small molecule drugs. This synthesizer demonstrates the versatility of substrates and the capacity to potentially expand the type of research conducted on novel drug molecules without human intervention.

== Characterization ==
Necessary to organic synthesis is characterization. Characterization refers to the measurement of chemical and physical properties of a given compound, and comes in many forms. Examples of common characterization methods include: nuclear magnetic resonance (NMR), mass spectrometry, Fourier-transform infrared spectroscopy (FTIR), and melting point analysis. Each of these techniques allow for a chemist to obtain structural information about a newly synthesized organic compound. Depending on the nature of the product, the characterization method used can vary.

== Relevance ==
Organic synthesis is an important chemical process that is integral to many scientific fields. Examples of fields beyond chemistry that require organic synthesis include the medical industry, pharmaceutical industry, and many more. Organic processes allow for the industrial-scale creation of pharmaceutical products. An example of such a synthesis is Ibuprofen. Ibuprofen can be synthesized from a series of reactions including: reduction, acidification, formation of a Grignard reagent, and carboxylation.

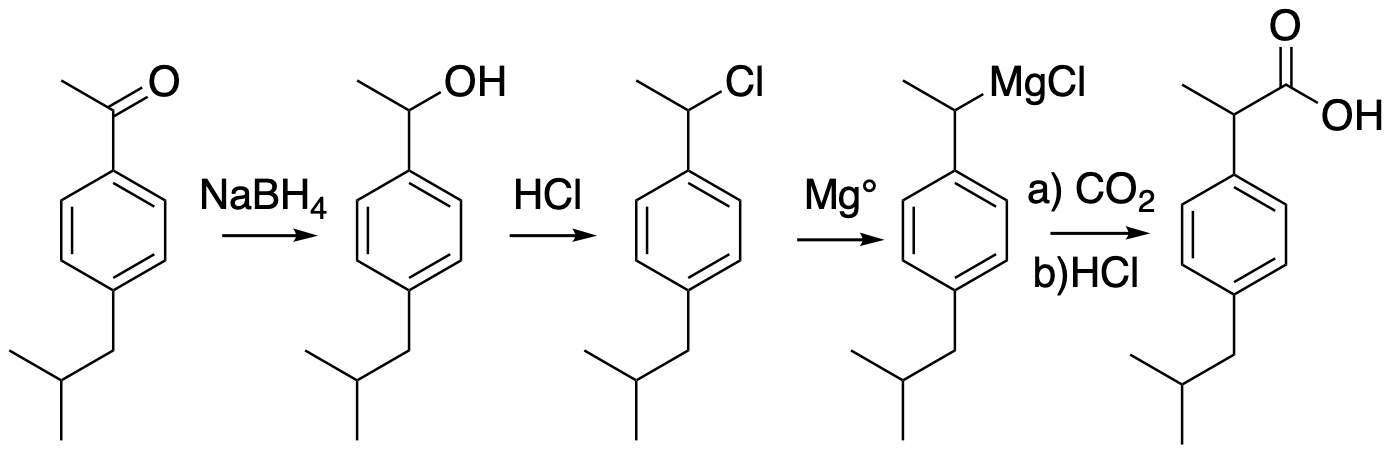
Synthesis of ibuprofen by Kjonass et al.

In the synthesis of Ibuprofen proposed by Kjonass et al., p-isobutylacetophenone, the starting material, is reduced with sodium borohydride (NaBH_{4}) to form an alcohol functional group. The resulting intermediate is acidified with HCl to create a chlorine group. The chlorine group is then reacted with magnesium turnings to form a Grignard reagent. This Grignard is carboxylated and the resulting product is worked up to synthesize ibuprofen.

== See also ==
- Automated synthesis
- Electrosynthesis
- Methods in Organic Synthesis (journal)
- Organic Syntheses (journal)
- Total synthesis
