= Suction filtration =

Fast filtration technique

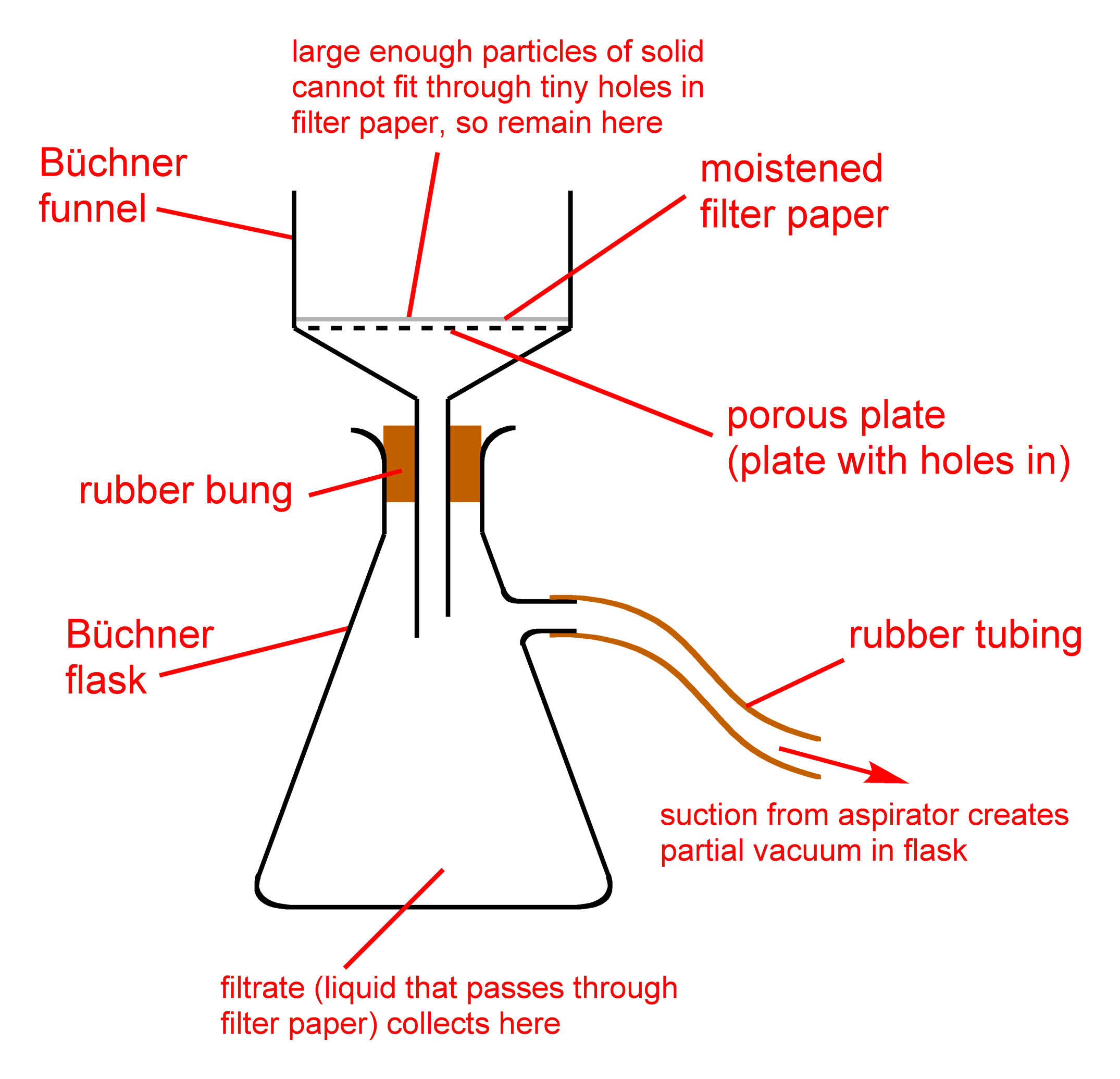

Vacuum filtration is a fast filtration technique used to separate solids from liquids.

== Principle ==
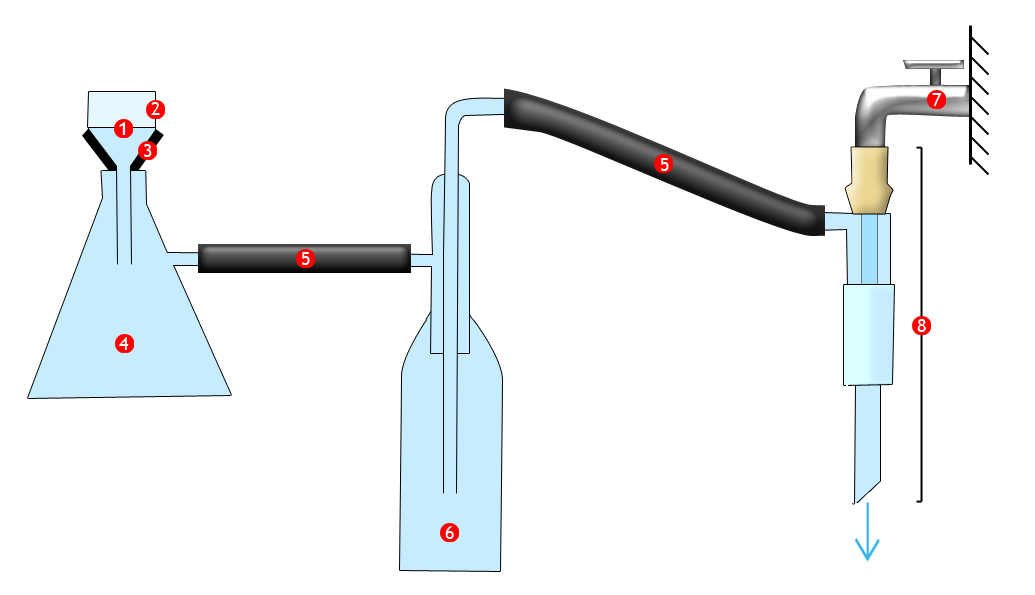
Diagram of the vacuum filtration apparatus

By flowing through the aspirator, water will suck out the air contained in the vacuum flask and the Büchner flask. There is therefore a difference in pressure between the exterior and the interior of the flasks: the contents of the Büchner funnel are sucked towards the vacuum flask. The filter, which is placed at the bottom of the Büchner funnel, separates the solids from the liquids.

The solid residue, which remains at the top of the Büchner funnel, is therefore recovered more efficiently: it is much drier than it would be with a simple filtration.

The rubber conical seal ensures the apparatus is hermetically closed, preventing the passage of air between the Büchner funnel and the vacuum flask. It maintains the vacuum in the apparatus and also avoids physical points of stress (glass against glass.)

=== Diagram annotations ===
1. Filter
2. Büchner funnel
3. Conic seal
4. Büchner flask
5. Air tube
6. Vacuum flask
7. Water tap
8. Aspirator

== Uses ==
Filtration is a unit operation that is commonly used both in laboratory and production conditions. This apparatus, adapted for laboratory work, is often used to isolate the product of synthesis of a reaction when the product is a solid in suspension. The product of synthesis is then recovered faster, and the solid is drier than in the case of a simple filtration. Other than isolating a solid, filtration is also a stage of purification: the soluble impurities in the solvent are eliminated in the filtrate (liquid).

This apparatus is often used to purify a liquid. When a synthesised product is filtered, the insolubles (catalysers, impurities, sub-products of the reaction, salts, ...) remain in the filter. In this case, vacuum filtration is also more efficient that a simple filtration: there is more liquid recovered, and the yield is therefore better.

== Practical aspects ==
It is often necessary to maintain the Büchner flask and, incidentally, the vacuum flask. The rigidity of the vacuum pipes and the difference in height between the different parts of the apparatus (as visible in the diagram) make such an apparatus relatively unstable.

Therefore, a three-pronged clamp should be used to maintain the Büchner flask. This clamp should be placed such that the two prongs surround the part of the flask connected to the vacuum tube, the lasting prong resting on the other side.

If it is also necessary to maintain the vacuum flask we use either a mandible clamp, or a three-pronged clamp, depending on the apparatus and its stability. The clamp to use is left to the judgement of the operator.

Before closing the tap, it is necessary to "break the vacuum" (letting in the air in through any area in the apparatus, by removing the funnel for example), otherwise water goes up the apparatus from the aspirator. The vacuum flask prevents the water from going up the Büchner flask.

== Sources ==
Vacuum Filtration

Vacuum Filtration
