= Automated synthesis =

Type of chemical synthesis

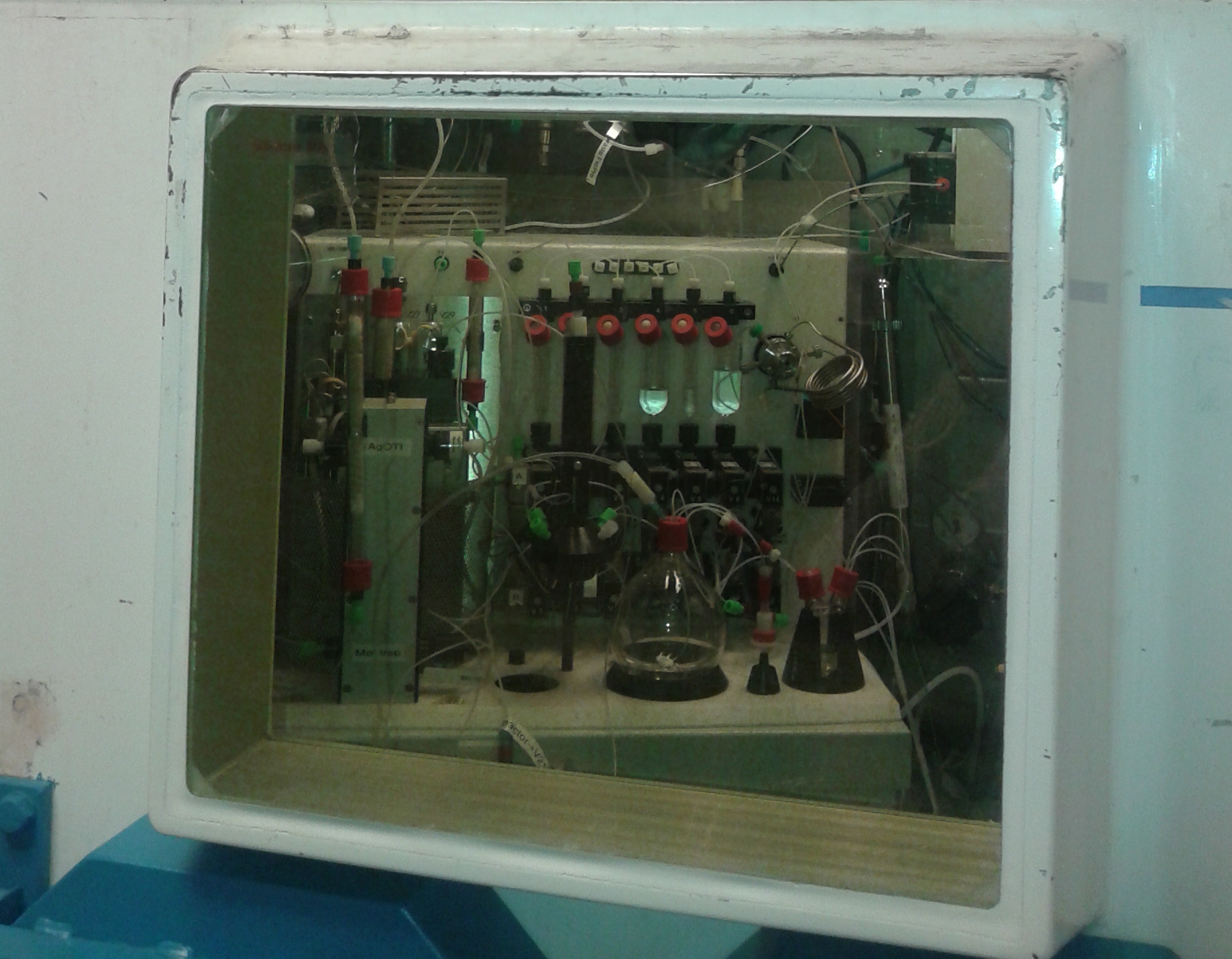
A fully automated radiosynthesis module

Automated synthesis or automatic synthesis is a set of techniques that use robotic equipment to perform chemical synthesis using a robotic system run using software control. Automating processes allows for higher efficiency and product quality although automation technology can be cost-prohibitive and there are concerns regarding overdependence and job displacement. Chemical processes were automated throughout the 19th and 20th centuries, with major developments happening in the previous thirty years, as technology advanced. Tasks that are performed may include: synthesis in variety of different conditions, sample preparation, purification, and extractions. Applications of automated synthesis are found on research and industrial scales in a wide variety of fields including polymers, personal care, and radiosynthesis.

== Process ==
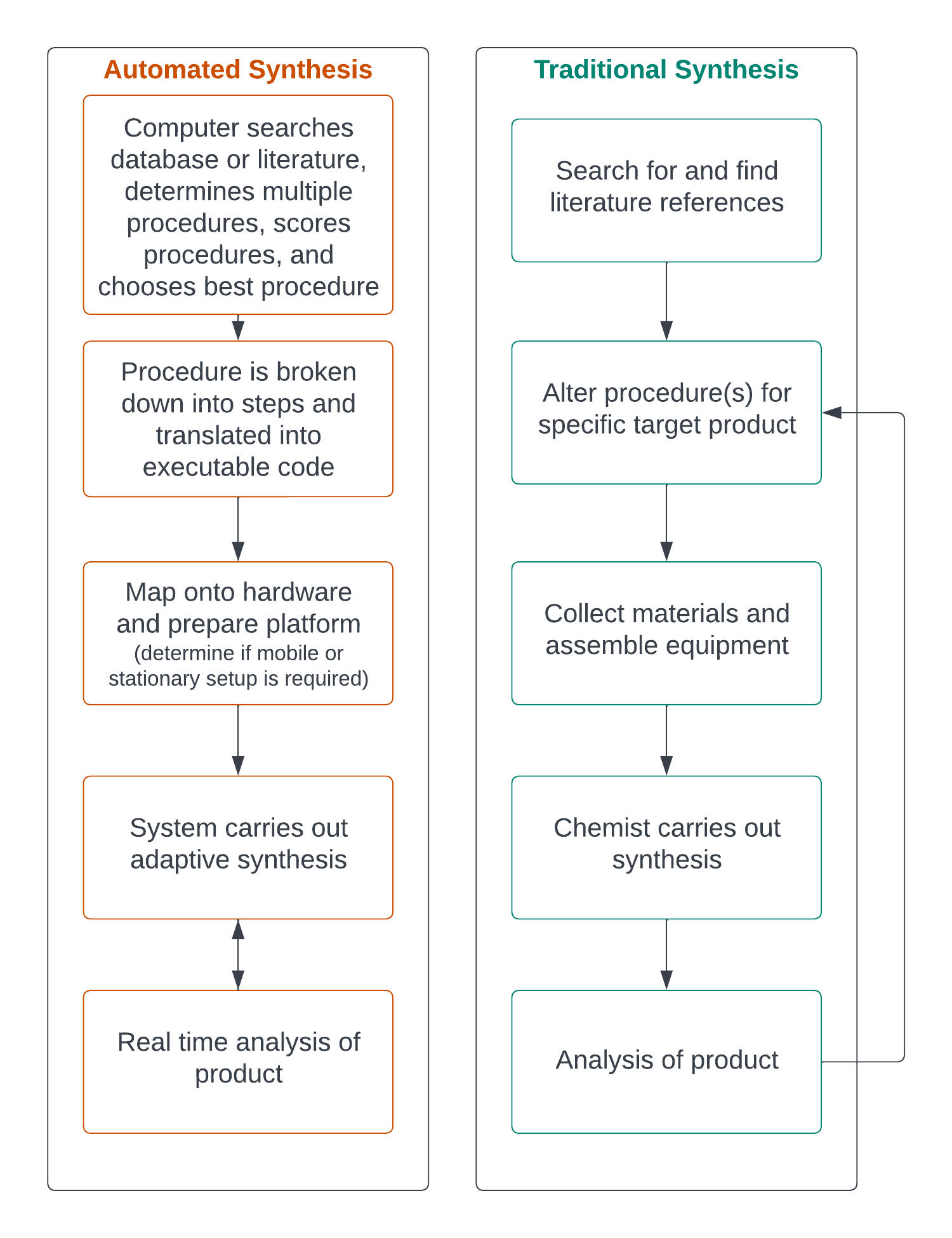
Flow chart comparing the procedures of an automated synthesis versus a manual or traditional synthesis.

An automated synthesis is very similar in procedure to performing a manual synthesis. The overseeing chemist decides on a target molecule then formulates the experimental plan, which is a sequential series of steps. Then, they collect the required equipment and execute the plan. The automated synthesis follows the same pathway, except that the computer devises and executes the experimental plan. However, human revision is usually still required to ensure the automated route is practical and there are no implicit steps or conditions missing from the proposed procedure.

In organic synthesis, organic synthesis software is used to automate the process of identifying sequences of reactions or routes that can be used to synthesize organic compounds.

== Benefits ==
Automation of synthesis has three main benefits: increased efficiency, quality (yields and purity), security, and safety, all resulting from decreased human involvement. As machines work faster than humans and are not prone to human error, throughput and reproducibility increases. Additionally, as humans spend less time in the lab exposure to dangerous chemicals is significantly decreased. This allows chemists additional time for theory and collaborative discussions.

Additional benefits include: multitasking, performing tasks beyond the scope of human precision or ability, exhaustive analysis, etc.

== Concerns ==
The primary concern of automated synthesis is job displacement. Other concerns are high initial investment and maintenance costs, privacy concerns, and an over-dependence on technology. There are also ethical concerns, regarding the use of artificial intelligence and robotics. See Ethics of artificial intelligence, Robot ethics, Machine ethics.

Parts of procedures and techniques were automated throughout the 19th and 20th centuries, using simple circuit boards. The first fully automatic synthesis was a peptide synthesis by Robert Merrifield and John Stewart in 1966. Applications of artificial intelligence to organic synthesis also started in the 1960s with the Dendral Project, which helped organic chemists characterize and identify molecules using mass spectrometry. True computer-assisted organic synthesis software (CAOS) such as LHASA became feasible as artificial intelligence and machine learning developed in the 1980s. Important developments in automated radiosynthetic modules were also made in the 1980s.

In the late 1990s, the main challenge of automation was overcoming phase-separation issues and increasing system integration. At this time there were only specific systems that belonged to one of four designs: a flow reactor, a batch reactor connected by flow lines, one robot, two robots: one for synthesis and one for analysis, and special larger systems that were a combination of the aforementioned.

The 2000s and 2010s saw significant development in industrial automation of molecules as well as the emergence of general synthesis systems that could synthesise a wide variety of molecules on-demand, whose operation Melanie Trobe and Martin D. Burke compared to that of a 3D printer.

== Applications ==
Automated synthesis systems find new applications with a development of new robotic platforms. Possible applications include: uncontrolled synthesis, time-dependent synthesis, radiosynthesis, synthesis in demanding conditions (low temperatures, presence of specific atmosphere like CO, H_{2}, N_{2}, high pressure or under vacuum) or whenever the same or similar workflow needs to be applied multiple times with the aim to: optimize reactions, synthesize many derivatives in small scale, perform reactions of iterative homologations or radiosynthesis.

Automated synthesis workflows are needed both in academic research and a wide array of industrial R&D settings (pharmaceuticals, agrochemicals, fine & specialty chemicals, renewables & energy research, catalysts, polymers, ceramics & abrasives, porous materials, nanomaterials, biomaterials, lubricants, paints & coatings, home care, personal care, nutrition, forensics).

=== Iterative homologations ===
Automated iterative homologation enables stepwise construction of carbon chains through repeated one-carbon extensions of boronic esters. Two reactions adapted to automation are the Matteson homologation, which inserts a methylene unit via chloromethyllithium, and chiral carbenoid homologation, which uses lithiated benzoate esters. Both methods have been implemented on robotic platforms under low-temperature, inert conditions. Using these techniques, up to six consecutive C(sp³)–C(sp³) bond-forming homologations have been performed without manual intervention, representing the highest number reported in an automated synthesis. The approach has also been applied to the synthesis of intermediates of the natural product (+)-kalkitoxin.

=== Polymers ===
==== Parallel synthesis ====
Overall, automated synthesis has improved the efficiency for the parallel synthesis and combinatorial methods of polymers. These techniques aim to design new materials, in addition to studying the relationships of their structure and properties. However, while screening for polymers enables this investigation, it becomes increasingly demanding for researchers to create the libraries for these synthetic compositions. In addition, preparation requires a large number of repetitive reactions to be completed, leading to an immense burden of planning and labor. Using automated synthesis, this process can be refined, increasing the efficiency of the reaction and removing the impact of human error.

===== Polycondensation =====
Polycondensation involves the formation of polymers through condensation reactions between different species, creating condensation polymers. With automated synthesis, General electric manufactured an approach for melt-polymerizations of BPA and diphenyl carbonate (DPC), using sodium hydroxide (NaOH) as the catalyst. Once the results were analyzed, it was shown that, by using an automated method of polymerization, the effect of varying the catalyst amount became more distinct and improved the reproducibility for the reaction. Furthermore, it demonstrated an increase within the homogeneity of the polymers in the microreactors.

===== Free-radical polymerization =====
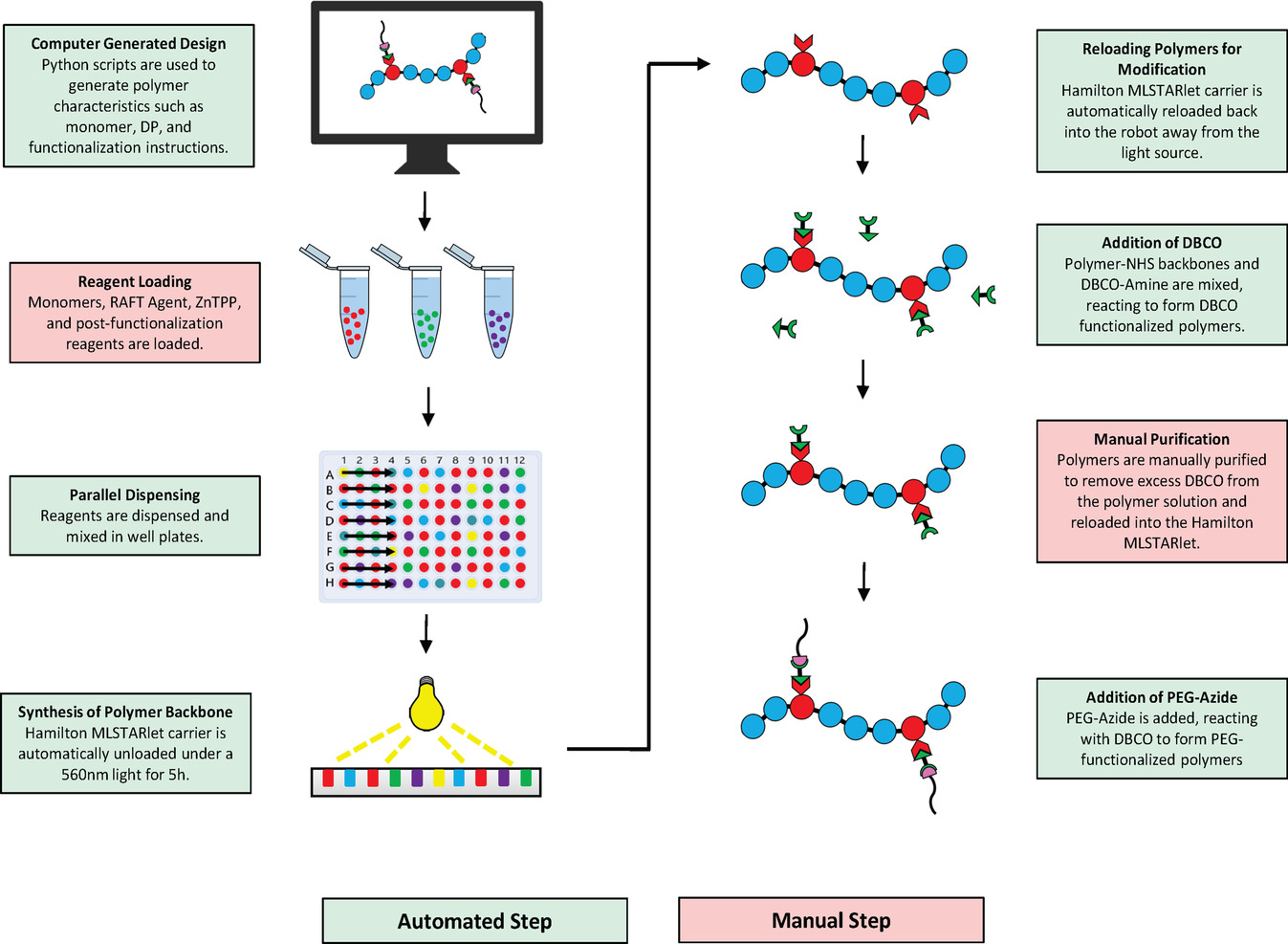
Automated synthesis and post-polymerization functionalization process

In addition to polycondensation, automated synthesis has been applied to the various methods of radical polymerization, such as ring-opening and polyolefins. This includes free-radical polymerization, such as the development of an automated process to synthesize and evaluate molecularly imprinted polymers (MIPs). Through thermal initiation, around sixty polymers could be prepared in parallel and evaluated through their binding constants to the imprinted analytes. Furthermore, adding another approach to the repertoire, Long et al. demonstrated the abilities of robotic systems and their use with varying the monomer for the synthesis of poly(styrene-co-methyl methacrylate) and poly(styrene-co-butyl methacrylate). After automatically precipitating, the products were characterized with standard analytics and added to the polymer library. Another example includes the method described by Symyx Technologies Inc. with the application of an ink-jet printer, delivering different ratios of styrene and acrylonitrile, which was used as the terminator.

While these are examples of suspension polymerization, the first instance of automated synthesis for parallel emulsion was reported by Voorn et al. with five parallel reactors containing well-defined systems of styrene and vinyl acetate. After optimizing the vortex speed, the results between the methods of automated synthesis and classical stirring for emulsion polymerization were compared, which found that the products were comparable.

===== Controlled radical polymerization =====
While juxtaposed against free-radical polymerization, the application of automated synthesis can be utilized for controlled radical polymerization too. These methods have been used within reversible addition-fragmentation transfer (RAFT), atom-transfer radical (ATRP), and nitroxide-mediated polymerizations, demonstrating the ability of robots to improve efficiency and reduce the hardship of performing reactions. For example, with the automatic dispensation of reagents, Symyx Technologies Inc. was able to polymerize styrene and butyl acrylate through ATRP. In addition, this functionality was supported by Zhang et al. within their research, finding that reproducibility and comparability were equivalent to classical ATRP.

===== Ring-opening polymerization =====
With ring-opening polymerization, automated synthesis has been used for rapid screening and optimization, including with catalyst + initiator systems and their polymerization conditions. For example, Hoogenboom et al. determined the optimal temperature for the polymerization of 2-ethyl-2-oxazoline in dimethylacetamide (DMAc), allowing for individual heating of the parallel reactors, which shortened the time needed for preparation and analysis.

===== Polyolefins =====
To aid with the catalyst research for polyolefins, Symyx Technologies Inc. used automated synthesis to create a library of palladium and nickel catalysts, which were screened for ethylene polymerization. This process found that the largest polyethylene polymers were created by the complexes with the highest steric hindrance for the ortho-positions of the aryl rings, while electronic factors did not influence yield or molecular weight. In addition, Tuchbreiter and Mülhaupt used automated synthesis to demonstrate the improvements of minireactors for the polymerization of olefins, with quality improving as compared to utilizing simple arrays.

===== Supramolecular polymerization =====
Within the field of supramolecular polymerization, Schmatloch et al. used automated synthesis to create main-chain supramolecular coordination polymers, reacting bis(2,2′:6′,2″-terpyridine)-functionalized poly(ethylene oxide) with various metal(II) acetates. From this, it was revealed that classical laboratory approaches could be transferred to automatic synthesis, optimizing the processes to increase efficiency and aid with reproducibility.

==== Recent developments ====
Schematic of automated process for PET–RAFT and Enz-RAFT.

Over the years, multiple synthesizers have been developed to assist with automated synthesis, including the Chemspeed Accelerator (SLT106, SLT II, ASW2000, SwingSLT, Autoplant A100, and SLT100), the Symyx system, and Freeslate ScPPR. Recently, researchers have investigated the optimization of these methods for controlled/living radical polymerization (CLRP), which faces issues with oxygen intolerance. This research has led to the development of oxygen-tolerant CLRP, including with the use of enzyme degassing of RAFT (Enz-RAFT), atom-transfer radical (ATRP) that possesses tolerance to air, and photoinduced electron/energy transfer–RAFT (PET–RAFT) polymerization. Through the use of liquid-handling robots, Tamasi et al. demonstrated the use of automated synthesis with executing multi-step procedures, enabling the reactions to investigate more elaborate schemes, such as with scale and complexity.

Lee Cronin and his team have developed a modular synthesis machine called the chemputer which uses a dedicated programming language for chemical synthesis.

== Robotic platforms ==
Automated synthesis systems are laboratory robots that combine of software and hardware. As synthesis is a linear combination of steps, the individual steps can be modularized into hardware that accomplishes the specific step (mixing, heating or cooling, product analysis, etc.). Such hardware includes robotic arms that use dispensers and grippers to transfer materials and shakers that adjust the stirring speed and cartesian coordinate system robots that operate on a X Y Z axis and can move items and perform synthesis within designated bounds.

Conditions of reactions (atmosphere, temperature, pressure) are controlled with the help of peripherals like: gas cylinders, vacuum pump, reflux system and cryostat. Modular platforms use a variety of tools in order to perform all the unit operations needed in synthesis. There are many commercial modular hardware solutions available to execute synthesis. New software programs are available that can compile an automated synthesis procedure in executable code directly from existing literature. There are also software programs that can retro-synthetically generate a procedure at the level of proficiency of a graduate student.
