= Filter dryer =

Manufacturing equipment

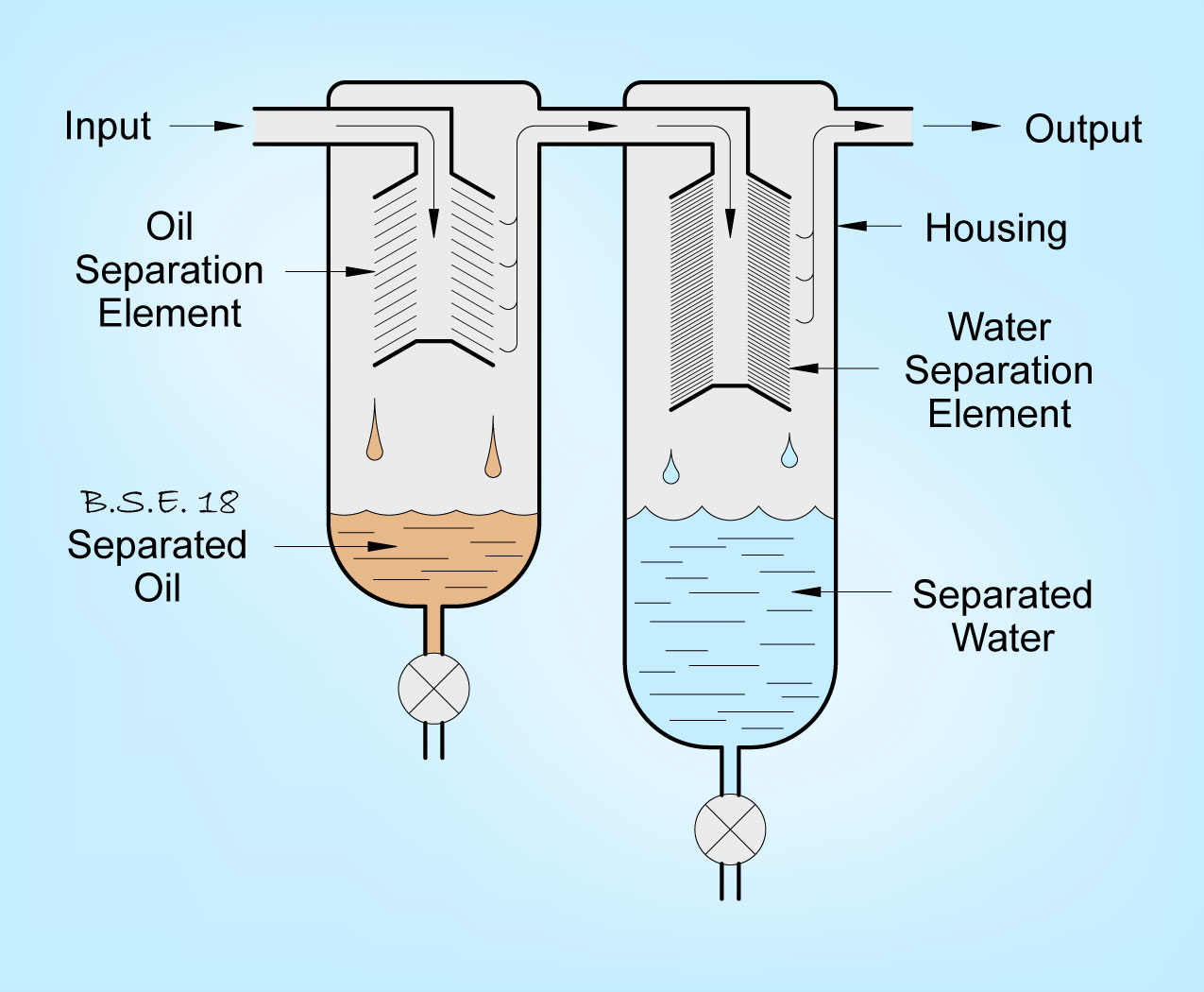
Filter dryer

A filter dryer is a piece of process equipment used during the filtration and drying phase of a pharmaceutical, bio pharmaceutical or chemical process for an active pharmaceutical ingredient (API) or other compounds production. Filter dryers are designed for washing and isolating solids with or without integrated containment systems.

Several actions have to be undertaken as part of the filtration and drying process including:

- slurry charging
- pressurized and / or vacuum filtration
- controlled heating and cooling
- cake smoothing and drying
- contained discharging and sampling
- vapor trap column, to trap solids particles ( fines ) carrying over with vapors
- clean-in-place (CIP)

An agitated Nutsche filter dryer (ANFD) is one class of such filter dryers that has been specifically designed so all these operations can take place within one vessel.

A Turbo Filter-Dryer is another class of filter dryer which also incorporates the listed operations, but works on a different set of filtration principle.

The ANFD class of filter dryer consists of a main insulated jacketed vessel and filtration base which can be lowered for inspection and replacement of the filter media. The vessel base is secured to the main vessel body via manually operated c-clamps or an automated bayonet locking system. The vessel is sealed with an O-ring sealing system utilizing FDA approved materials such as perfluoroelastomer.

The charging of slurry, solvent or water is carried out via nozzles mounted in the head of the vessel and the filtration process is performed under pressure using nitrogen purge and vacuum from beneath the filter base.

Different manufacturers use different heating technology, ANFDs should have a heating jacket on the walls as standard, on the top dome if necessary and heated agitator shaft and blade options for direct contact with the cake if required. One method of drying is through direct under-plate heating systems that are located in the filter plate at the bottom of the vessel.
