= Ernst Büchner =

German industrial chemist (1850–1924)

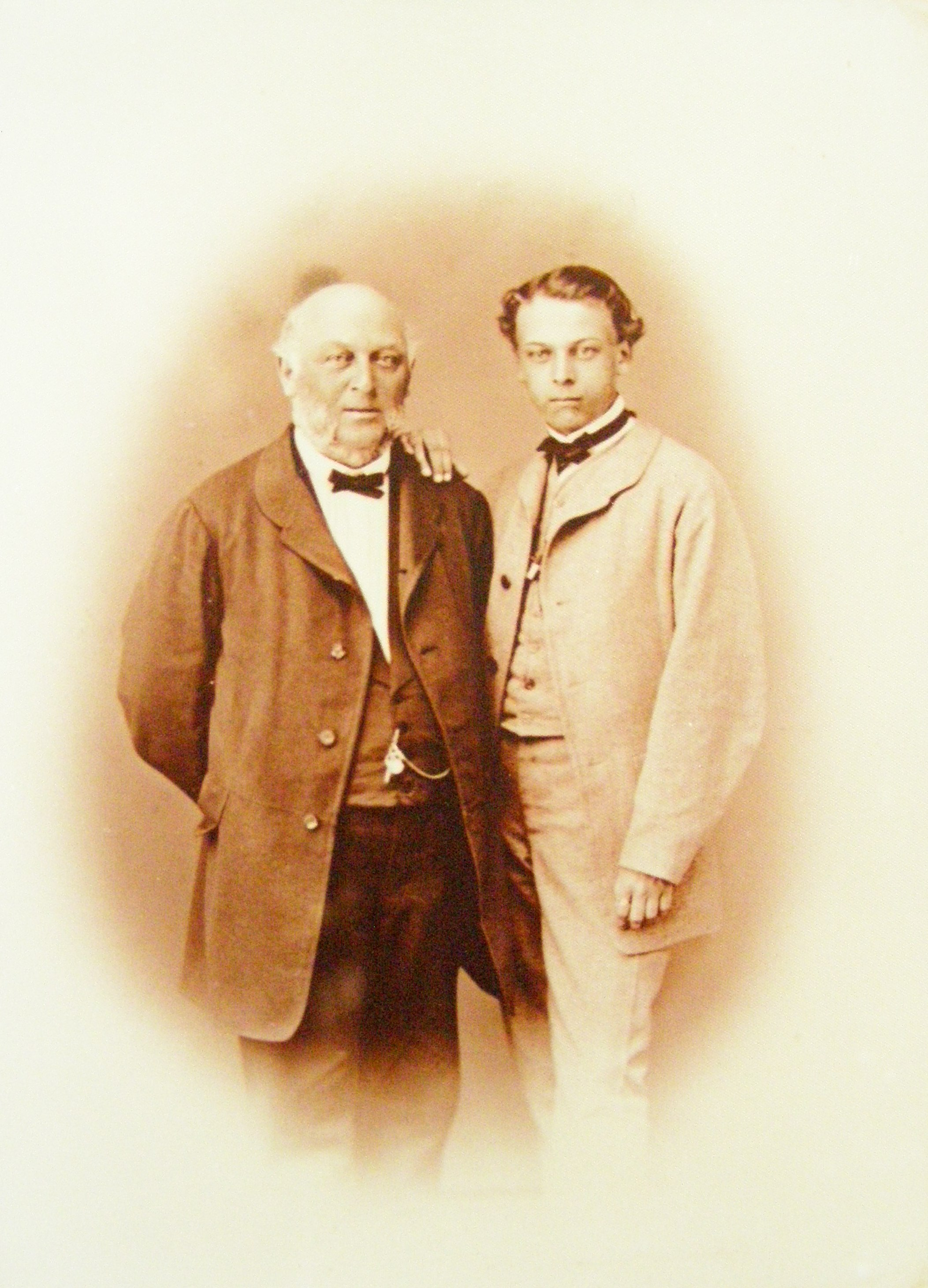
- Büchner (right) with his father Wilhelm^{(de)}, ca. 1865 in Pfungstadt
- Born: 18 March 1850; Pfungstadt, Germany
- Died: 25 April 1924 (aged 74); Darmstadt, Germany

Ernst Wilhelm Büchner (18 March 1850 – 25 April 1924) was the German industrial chemist after whom the Büchner flask and Büchner funnel are named. The patent for his two inventions was published in 1888.

== Life ==
His father was the pharmacist, chemist, industrialist and politician Wilhelm Büchner. Ernst was also the nephew of the playwright Georg Büchner and the philosopher, physiologist and physician Ludwig Büchner. Büchner studied chemistry in Tübingen. In his dissertation, he addressed the issue of separation of Chlorbromanilins. In 1882, Ernst Büchner took over the management of the family business. In 1890 he divided the Pfungstadt operating in the "United ultramarine factories". The creation of such an agreement was in response to the emerging "petrochemistry" whose further growth finally resulted in the extinction of the company in 1893.
