= Avinash Deshpande =

Indian astrophysicist

Avinash Deshpande (desh)
- Born: 23 January 1958 (age 68); India
- Education: IIT Kanpur; IIT Bombay; University of Tasmania
- Known for: Studies on Interstellar space and Pulsars
- Awards: 2002 Shanti Swarup Bhatnagar Prize
- Scientific career
- Fields: Astrophysics
- Workplaces: Raman Research Institute

Avinash Anant Deshpande (born 23 January 1958) is an Indian astrophysicist and a professor of physics at Raman Research Institute. Known for his research on astrophysics, Deshpande is known to have contributed towards the studies of the pulsar magnetospheric emission regions and in the elucidation of unphysically ultradense neutral hydrogen irregularities in the interstellar space.

Born on 23 January 1958, Desh graduated in electrical engineering from the Indian Institute of Technology, Kanpur in 1980 and started his career by joining Raman Research Institute. He did his doctoral research at RRI which earned him his PhD from the Indian Institute of Technology, Mumbai in 1988 and subsequently, did his post doctoral work at University of Tasmania during 1990–92. On his return to India, he resumed his service at RRI and holds the position of a professor there, continuing his research at the electronic laboratory of the institute. He has been involved in a number of projects undertaken by RRI and he is credited with the development of a receiver for high time-resolution studies of pulsars at low radio frequencies. His studies have been documented by way of a number of articles and Google Scholar, an online article repository of scientific articles, has listed 223 of them. The Council of Scientific and Industrial Research, the apex agency of the Government of India for scientific research, awarded him the Shanti Swarup Bhatnagar Prize for Science and Technology, one of the highest Indian science awards, for his contributions to physical sciences in 2002.

Avinash continues to give guest lectures at various institutes to encourage more students to join the field.|

== See also ==
- Interstellar Medium
- Milky Way
- Radiosynthesis
- The Pulsars
