= Divergent synthesis =

Method of chemical research

In chemistry a divergent synthesis is a strategy with the aim to improve the efficiency of chemical synthesis. It is often an alternative to convergent synthesis or linear synthesis.

In one strategy divergent synthesis aims to generate a library of chemical compounds by first reacting a molecule with a set of reactants. The next generation of compounds is generated by further reactions with each compound in generation 1. This methodology quickly diverges to large numbers of new compounds

- A generates A1, A2, A3, A4, A5 in generation 1
- A1 generates A11, A12, A13 in generation 2 and so on.

An entire library of new chemical compounds, for instance saccharides, can be screened for desirable properties. In another strategy divergent synthesis starts from a molecule as a central core from which successive generations of building blocks are added. A good example is the divergent synthesis of dendrimers, for example, where in each generation a new monomer reacts to the growing surface of the sphere.

== Diversity oriented synthesis ==
Diversity oriented synthesis or DOS is a strategy for quick access to molecule libraries with an emphasis on skeletal diversity. In one such application a Petasis reaction product (1) is functionalized with propargyl bromide leading to a starting compound (2) having 5 functional groups. This molecule can be subjected to a range of reagents yielding unique molecular skeletons in one generation.

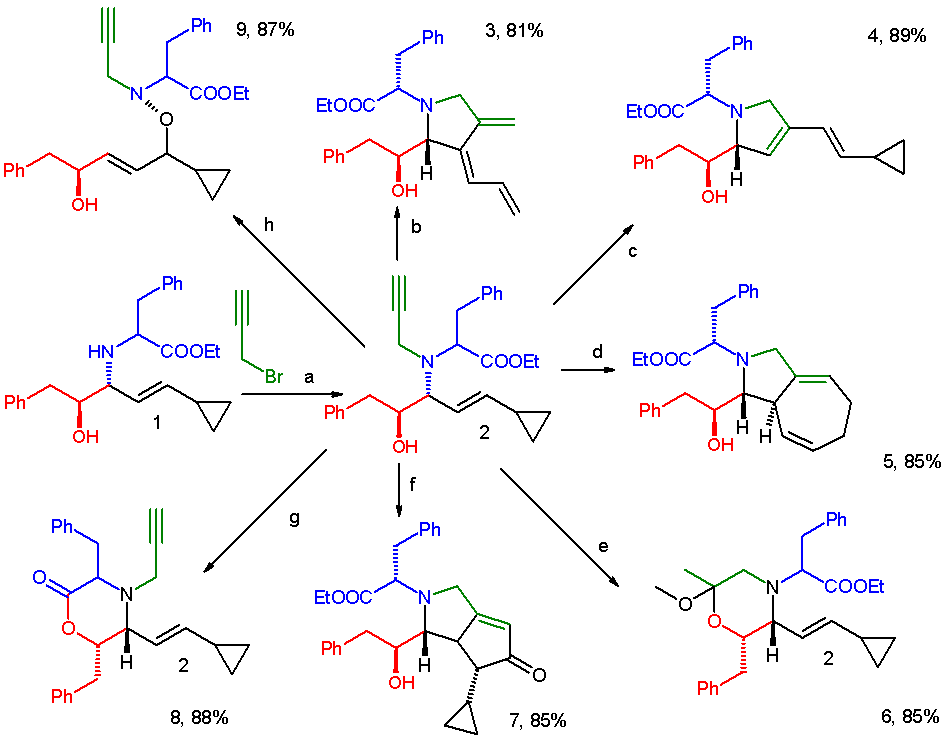
Short Synthesis of Skeletally and Stereochemically Diverse Small Molecules by Coupling Petasis Condensation Reactions to Cyclization Reactions

== DOS Drugs ==
1. Dosabulin
2. Gemmacin B
3. ML238
4. Robotnikinin
