= Radiosynthesis =

Method to create radioactive chemicals

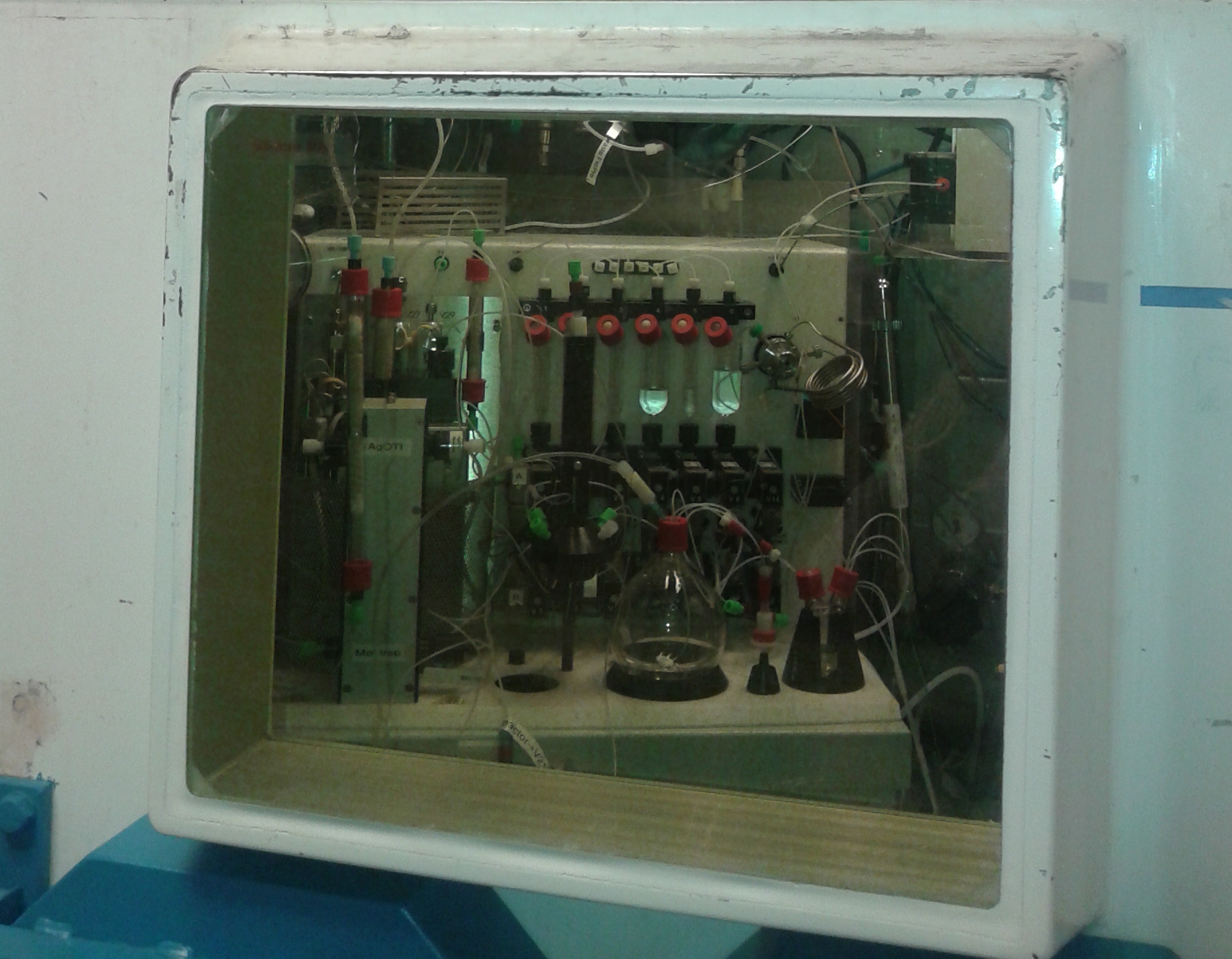
A fully automated radiosynthesis interface

Radiosynthesis is a fully automated synthesis method in which radioactive compounds are produced. Radiosynthesis is generally carried out by several nuclear interface modules, which are protected by the lead shielding and controlled by a computer semi-automatically. The set-ups of modules are different depending on the type of product and synthesis process. Consequently, the modules should be adapted with the synthesis stages. In some cases, such stages of synthesis are carried out manually in order to optimize the radiochemical yield or due to the incompatibility or lack of module.

== Module ==
Radiosynthesis modules consist of following constant components:

- Reservoir: To store reactants
- Pipe : To link all components together
- Valve : To manage the flow of liquids
- Reactor : To proceed the reaction(s)
- Temperature and Radioactivity sensor : To adjust and measure the temperature and radioactivity
- Preparative HPLC : To purify the Product

There are also some components which are added based on the synthesis set-up such as stirrers, sterile filters, Sep-Paks™, vials, bottles, detectors etc..

Before every synthesis, the modules should be washed. It should also be mentioned that according to Half-life of radionuclides, a relaxation time is needed between the syntheses in each module. Fig.1 shows the schematic of a sample module.

Radiosynthesis modules are often combined with a cyclotron or other radio nuclide generator.

== See also ==
- Hot cell
- Medicinal radiocompound
