= Convergent synthesis =

Strategy to improve chemical synthesis

In chemistry a convergent synthesis is a strategy that aims to improve the efficiency of multistep synthesis, most often in organic synthesis. In this type of synthesis several individual pieces of a complex molecule are synthesized in stage one, and then in stage two these pieces are combined to form the final product. In linear synthesis the overall yield quickly drops with each reaction step:

A → B → C → D

Suppose the yield is 50% for each reaction; the overall yield of D is only 12.5% from A.

In a convergent synthesis

A → B (50%)
C → D (50%)
B + D → E (25%)

the overall yield of E (25%) looks much better. Convergent synthesis is applied in the synthesis of complex molecules and involves fragment coupling and independent synthesis. This technique is more useful if the compound is large and symmetric, where at least two aspects of the molecule can be formed separately and still come together.

Examples:

- Convergent synthesis is encountered in dendrimer synthesis where branches (with the number of generations preset) are connected to the central core.
- Proteins of up to 300 amino acids are produced by a convergent approach using chemical ligation.
- An example of its use in total synthesis is the final step (photochemical [2+2]cycloaddition) towards the compound biyouyanagin A:

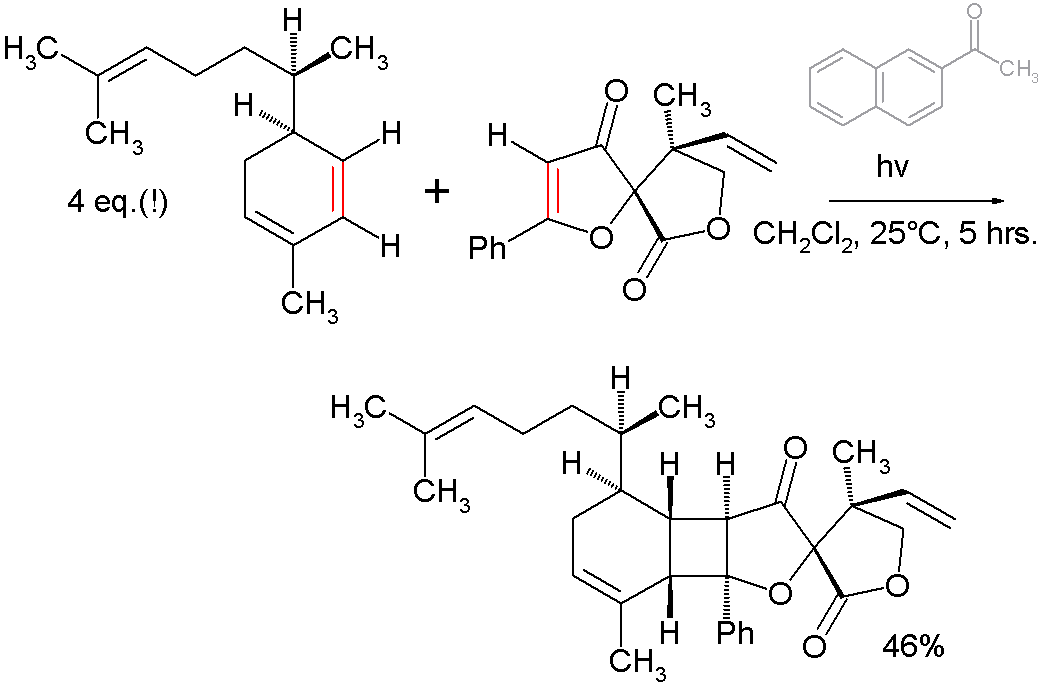

== See also ==
- Divergent synthesis
