= Büchner funnel =

Filtration apparatus used in a chemistry lab

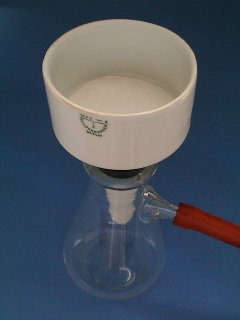
- A Büchner funnel with a paper filter inside, connected to a side-arm flask by means of a neoprene adapter, with a tube leading to a vacuum pump
- Uses: Filtration
- Inventor: Ernst Büchner
- Related items: Dropping funnel Separatory funnel

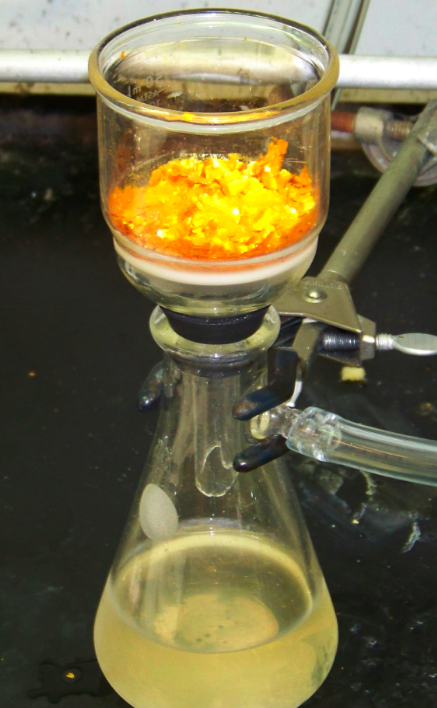
A Büchner funnel with a sintered glass disc

A Büchner funnel is a piece of laboratory equipment used in filtration. It is traditionally made of porcelain, but glass and plastic funnels are also available. On top of the funnel-shaped part there is a cylinder with a fritted glass disc/perforated plate separating it from the funnel. The Hirsch funnel has a similar design; it is used similarly, but for smaller quantities of material. The main difference is that the plate of a Hirsch funnel is much smaller, and the walls of the funnel angle outward instead of being vertical.

== Method ==
A funnel with a fritted glass disc can be used immediately. For a funnel with a perforated plate, filtration material in the form of filter paper is placed on the plate, and the filter paper is moistened with a liquid to prevent initial leakage. The liquid to be filtered is poured into the cylinder and drawn through the perforated plate/fritted glass disc by vacuum suction.

The main advantage in using this type of filtration is that it proceeds much more quickly (several orders of magnitude) than simply allowing the liquid to drain through the filter medium via the force of gravity. It is essential that the amount of liquid being used is limited to less than what would overflow the flask; otherwise, the liquid will be drawn into the vacuum equipment. If the vacuum is provided by a water flow device, an overflow of the liquid could result in the spilling of a hazardous liquid into the wastewater stream, a potential violation of the law, depending on the liquid. The potential for overflow and the potential for water to be drawn back into the flask can be reduced by using a trap between the flask and the vacuum source.

It is used in organic chemistry labs to assist in collecting recrystallized compounds. The suction allows the wet recrystallized compound to dry out such that the pure dried crystal compound is left remaining. However, it is often the case that further drying is required, by an oven or other means, in order to remove as much residual liquid as possible.

It is often used in combination with a Büchner flask, Büchner ring and sinter seals. A vacuum tight seal and stability of the Büchner flask and filter are essential during the filtration process. A Büchner ring can be used with Büchner funnels, flasks, glass crucibles and Gooch crucibles. The wide flange and large surface contact ensures an excellent vacuum tight seal whilst the rings are easy to remove and offer excellent support to even the largest funnels.

It is commonly thought to be named after the Nobel Laureate Eduard Buchner (without umlaut), but it is actually named after the industrial chemist Ernst Büchner.

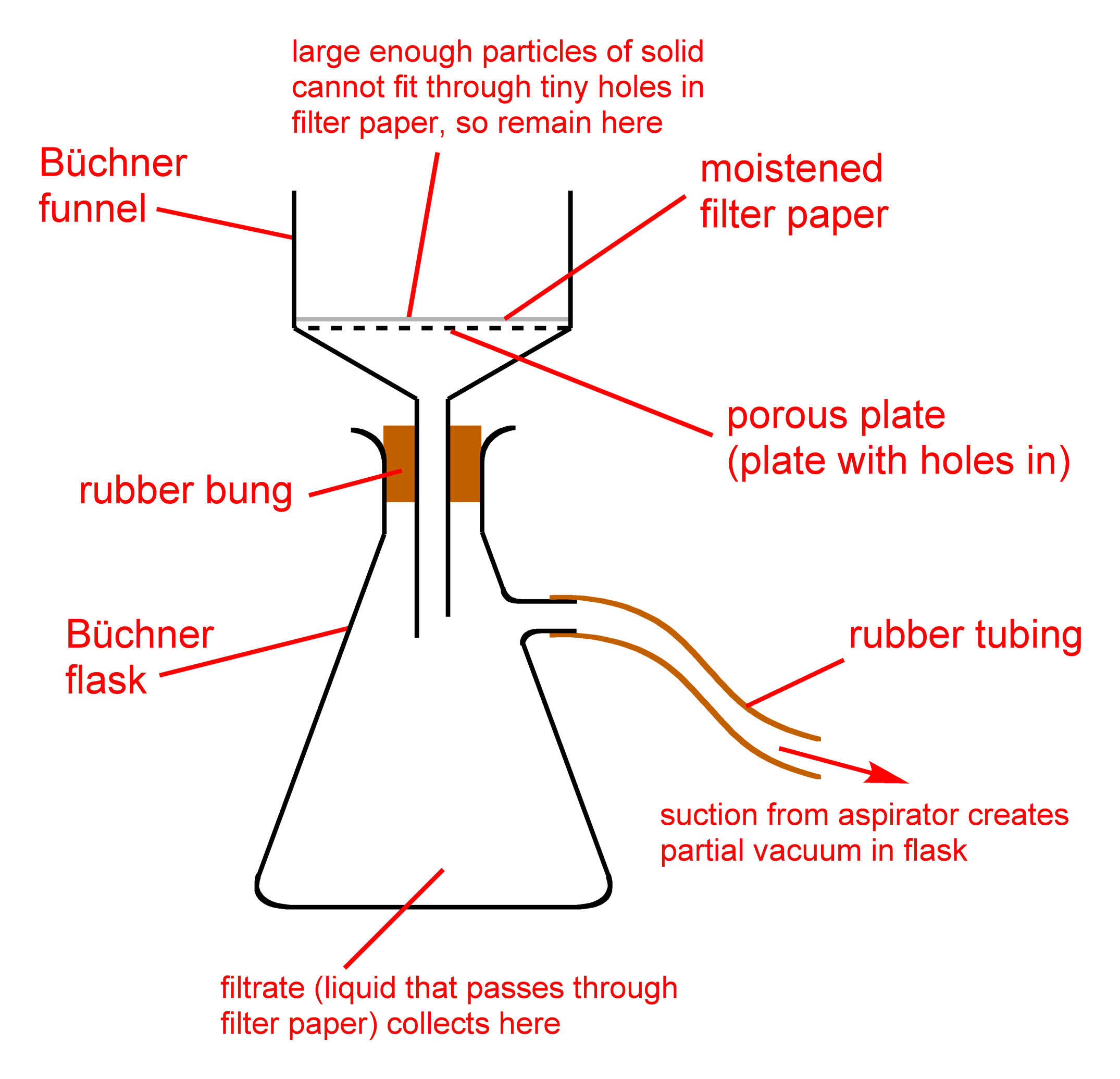
Diagram of filtration set-up using a Büchner flask

== See also ==
- Agitated Nutsche Filter – the industrial-scale analog of the Büchner funnel.
