= List of computer-assisted organic synthesis software =

Computer-assisted organic synthesis software is a type of application software used in organic chemistry in tandem with computational chemistry to help facilitate the tasks of designing, predicting, and producing chemical reactions. CAOS aims to identify a series of chemical reactions which, from a starting compound, can produce a desired molecule. CAOS algorithms typically use two databases: a first one of known chemical reactions and a second one of known starting materials (i.e., typically molecules available commercially). Desirable synthetic plans cost less, have high yield, and avoid using hazardous reactions and intermediates. Typically cast as a planning problem, significant progress has been made in CAOS.

== CAOS programs ==
- M1 RetroScore powered by CAS – demo available, based on ML models trained on CAS SciFinder data
- Syntheseus –
- ChemAIRS – demo available, developed by Chemical.AI as a commercial suite of software. In addition to retrosynthesis, the tool has some unique functions such as SA (synthetic accessibility) score and process chemistry.
- Spaya – Retrosynthesis planning tool freely accessible provided by Iktos
- IBM RXN – A freely accessible, cloud-based service developed by IBM that uses AI models to predict chemical reactions and generate retrosynthesis pathways. The tool suite also provides additional capabilities, such as robotic integration and model finetuning, for paid subscribers.
- AiZynthFinder – A freely accessible open source retrosynthetic planning tool developed as a collaboration between AstraZeneca and the University of Bern. AiZynthFinder predicts synthetic routes to a given target compound, and can be retrained on a users own dataset whether from public or proprietary sources.
- Manifold – Compound searching and retrosynthesis planning tool freely accessible to academic users, developed by PostEra
- WODCA – no trial version; proprietary software
- Organic Synthesis Exploration Tool (OSET) – open-source software, abandoned
- CHIRON – no trial version; proprietary software
- SynGen – demo version; proprietary software; a unique program for automatic organic synthesis generation; focuses on generating the shortest, lowest cost synthetic routes for a given target organic compound, and is thus a useful tool for synthesis planning
- LHASA – demo available but not linked (?); proprietary software
- SYLVIA – demo version; proprietary software; rapidly evaluates the ease of synthesis of organic compounds; can prioritize thousands of structures (e.g., generated by de novo design experiments or retrieved from large virtual compound libraries) according to their synthetic complexity
- ChemPlanner (formerly ARChem – Route Designer) - is an expert system to help chemists design viable synthetic routes for their target molecules; the knowledge base of reaction rules is algorithmically derived from reaction databases, and commercially available starting materials are used as termination points for the retrosynthetic search
- ICSYNTH – demo available; proprietary software; A computer aided synthesis design tool that enables chemists to generate synthetic pathways for a target molecule, and a multistep interactive synthesis tree; at its core is an algorithmic chemical knowledge base of transform libraries that are automatically generated from reaction databases.
- Chematica (Now known as Synthia)
- SynPlanner – An open-source computer-assisted synthesis planning tool developed at the University of Strasbourg and Hokkaido University. It uses Monte Carlo Tree Search (MCTS) guided by graph neural networks for retrosynthetic planning. The software provides an end-to-end workflow for reaction data curation, reaction rule extraction, model training, and synthesis planning, with graphical and command-line interfaces.
- ASKCOS – Open-source suite of synthesis planning and computational chemistry tools.

== See also ==
- Comparison of software for molecular mechanics modeling
- Molecular design software
- Molecule editor
- Molecular modeling on GPU
- List of software for nanostructures modeling
- Semi-empirical quantum chemistry methods
- Computational chemical methods in solid state physics, with periodic boundary conditions
- Valence bond programs
