= Gravity filtration =

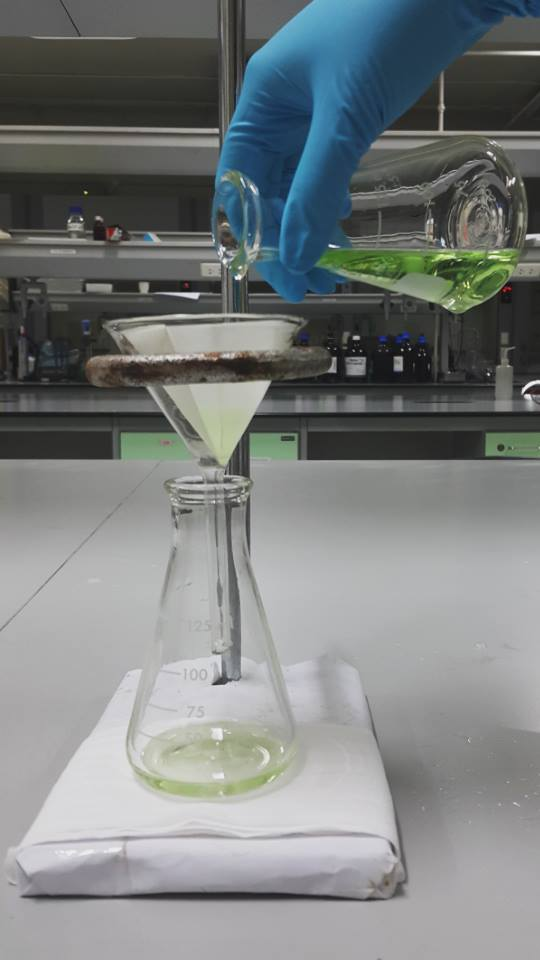
Gravity Filtration

Gravity filtration is a method of filtering impurities from solutions by using gravity to pull liquid through a filter. The two main kinds of filtration used in laboratories are gravity and vacuum/suction. Gravity filtration is often used in chemical laboratories to filter precipitates from precipitation reactions as well as drying agents, inadmissible side items, or remaining reactants. While it can also be used to separate out strong products, vacuum filtration is more commonly used for this purpose.

== Method ==
The process of removing suspended matter contains two steps: transport and attachment. This mode occurs when particles move to another place through the filter paper.

Gravity filtration is an easy way to remove solid impurities or the precipitation from an organic liquid. The impurity is trapped in the filter. Gravity filtration can collect any insoluble solid.

== History ==
Early in human history, people obtained clear water from muddy rivers or lakes by digging holes in sandy banks to a depth below the waterline of the river or lake. The sand filtered the water and clear water fills the hole; this method was used to reform cities and purify urban waters.

In farming, people used gravity filtration to let water from higher areas flow to lower areas through filters. In this way, sand and small stones filter impurities producing clear water.

In Asia, people pump water from wells and put it into a jar with a small hole at the bottom. The jar is filled with small stones and the hole is covered with layers of gauze.

== Classic methods ==
Filtration is commonly used to filter out solutions contain solids or insoluble precipitation.

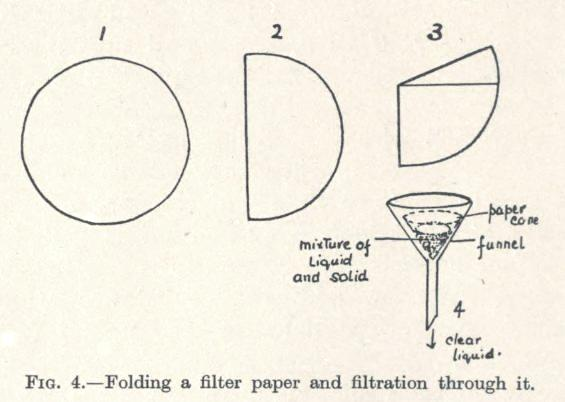

The solution is poured through a piece of filter paper folded into a cone in a glass funnel. Solids (or flocs) remain on the filter paper while the filtered solution is caught by a flask under the funnel. If a large volume of solution is filtered, the filter paper will need to be changed in order to prevent clogging.

== Experimental error ==
In many laboratories, gravity filtration is used to filter out solids to determine reaction yield. Several experimental errors need to be taken into account.

Some precipitated solid remains on the filter paper or in the funnel. In this case, a gap appears between the product yield and the measured yield.

If the precipitated solid is not dried thoroughly, excess fluid influences the experimental results. The actual yield of precipitation may then appear larger than the theoretical yield.

Incorrect use of filter paper may influence the filtration. Additionally, damaging the filter paper can allow small bits of precipitated solids to pass through the filter.

== Industry examples ==
=== Seawater ===
A variety of filtration operations were tested with seawater for dissolving high concentrations of dimethylsulfoniopropionate.

=== Conventional ===
These filters contain three stages: flocculation, clarification and filtration.

Typical rapid gravity filters contain filter tanks made of coated or stainless steel or aluminum. Influent flows fall through the filter and are captured by the underdrain. The filter media removes particles from the water. It usually has 3 layers: anthracite coal, silica sand and gravel.

This approach is effective for removing impurities and uses less cleaning time, lowering cost.

=== Microorganisms ===
The project was to remove parasites and other contaminants such as lead. The project used multi-hole filters with diameters that allow water to flow by gravity.

=== Gravity media filters ===
These filters are used for industry applications. The filter lets the fluid stream pass through the media to remain or filter out impurities. It can support large volumes.

Some gravity filter systems in the chemistry industry can remove chlorine and other organics or remove iron and heavy sediments or sand.

=== Gravity filter (liquid) ===
Liquid is removed from a gas stream by coalescers in a single stage. The elements enter with the flow and then pass through the distributor. This is a primary separation device that can remove particles and then coalesce the cartridges in an inside-to-out direction. In this case, the liquids pass through the structure of the filter and then drain from the vessel.

=== Model SK ===
This filter is an open sand filter system used for water treatment in low budget environments. It can suit a variety of pressure-controlled backwashing. This filter is an automatic gravity filter that uses different pressures and backwashes the system with an injector. The system has no controls. The filters have no moving parts and no pumps. The backwashing water is held in a tank below the filter.

== See also ==
- Separation process
- Separation of mixtures
- Microfiltration
- Ultrafiltration
- Nanofiltration
- Reverse osmosis
- Crossflow filtration
- Sieve
- Sieve analysis
