= Filtration =

Process that separates solids from fluids

Diagram of simple filtration: oversize particles in the feed cannot pass through the lattice structure of the filter, while fluid and small particles pass through, becoming filtrate.

Filtration is a physical separation process that separates solid matter and fluid from a mixture using a filter medium that has a complex structure through which only the fluid can pass. Solid particles that cannot pass through the filter medium are described as oversize and the fluid that passes through is called the filtrate. Oversize particles may form a filter cake on top of the filter and may also block the filter lattice, preventing the fluid phase from crossing the filter, known as blinding. The size of the largest particles that can successfully pass through a filter is called the effective pore size of that filter. The separation of solid and fluid is imperfect; solids will be contaminated with some fluid and filtrate will contain fine particles (depending on the pore size, filter thickness and biological activity). Filtration occurs both in nature and in engineered systems; there are biological, geological, and industrial forms. In everyday usage the verb "strain" is more often used; for example, using a colander to drain cooking water from cooked pasta.

Oil filtration refers to the method of purifying oil by removing impurities that can degrade its quality. Contaminants can enter the oil through various means, including wear and tear of machinery components, environmental factors, and improper handling during oil changes. The primary goal of oil filtration is to enhance the oil’s performance, thereby protecting the machinery and extending its service life.(Can be found in textbooks)

Filtration is also used to describe biological and physical systems that not only separate solids from a fluid stream but also remove chemical species and biological organisms by entrainment, phagocytosis, adsorption and absorption. Examples include slow sand filters and trickling filters. It is also used as a general term for macrophage in which organisms use a variety of means to filter small food particles from their environment. Examples range from the microscopic Vorticella up to the basking shark, one of the largest fishes, and the baleen whales, all of which are described as filter feeders.

== Physical processes ==
- Filtration is used to separate particles and fluid in a suspension, where the fluid can be a liquid, a gas or a supercritical fluid. Depending on the application, either one or both of the components may be isolated.
- Filtration, as a physical operation enables materials of different chemical compositions to be separated. A solvent is chosen which dissolves one component, while not dissolving the other. By dissolving the mixture in the chosen solvent, one component will go into the solution and pass through the filter, while the other will be retained.
- Filtration is widely used in chemical engineering. It may be combined with other unit operations to process the feed stream, as in the biofilter, which is a combined filter and biological digestion device.
- Filtration differs from sieving, where separation occurs at a single perforated layer (a sieve). In sieving, particles that are too big to pass through the holes of the sieve are retained (see particle size distribution). In filtration, a multilayer lattice retains those particles that are unable to follow the tortuous channels of the filter. Oversize particles may form a cake layer on top of the filter and may also block the filter lattice, preventing the fluid phase from crossing the filter (blinding). Commercially, the term filter is applied to membranes where the separation lattice is so thin that the surface becomes the main zone of particle separation, even though these products might be described as sieves.
- Filtration differs from adsorption, where separation relies on surface charge. Some adsorption devices containing activated charcoal and ion-exchange resin are commercially called filters, although filtration is not their principal mechanical function.
- Filtration differs from removal of magnetic contaminants from fluids with magnets (typically lubrication oil, coolants and fuel oils) because there is no filter medium. Commercial devices called "magnetic filters" are sold, but the name reflects their use, not their mode of operation.
- In biological filters, oversize particulates are trapped and ingested and the resulting metabolites may be released. For example, in animals (including humans), renal filtration removes waste from the blood, and in water treatment and sewage treatment, undesirable constituents are removed by adsorption into a biological film grown on or in the filter medium, as in slow sand filtration.

=== Methods ===
Filters may be used for the purpose of removing unwanted liquid from a solid residue, cleaning unwanted solids from a liquid, or simply to separate the solid from the liquid.

There are many different methods of filtration; all aim to attain the separation of substances. Separation is achieved by some form of interaction between the substance or objects to be removed and the filter. The substance that is to pass through the filter must be a fluid, i.e. a liquid or gas. Methods of filtration vary depending on the location of the targeted material, i.e. whether it is dissolved in the fluid phase or suspended as a solid.

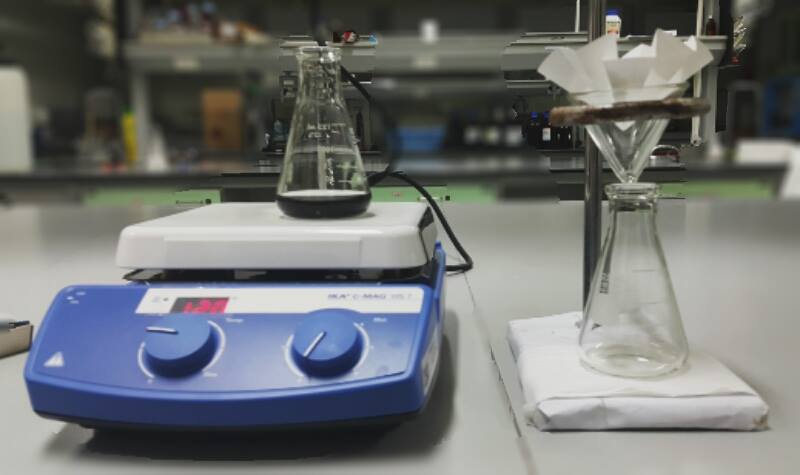
Hot filtration, solution contained in the Erlenmeyer flask is heated on a hot plate to prevent re-crystallization of solids in the flask itself

There are several laboratory filtration techniques depending on the desired outcome namely, hot, cold and vacuum filtration. Some of the major purposes of obtaining the desired outcome are, for the removal of impurities from a mixture or, for the isolation of solids from a mixture.

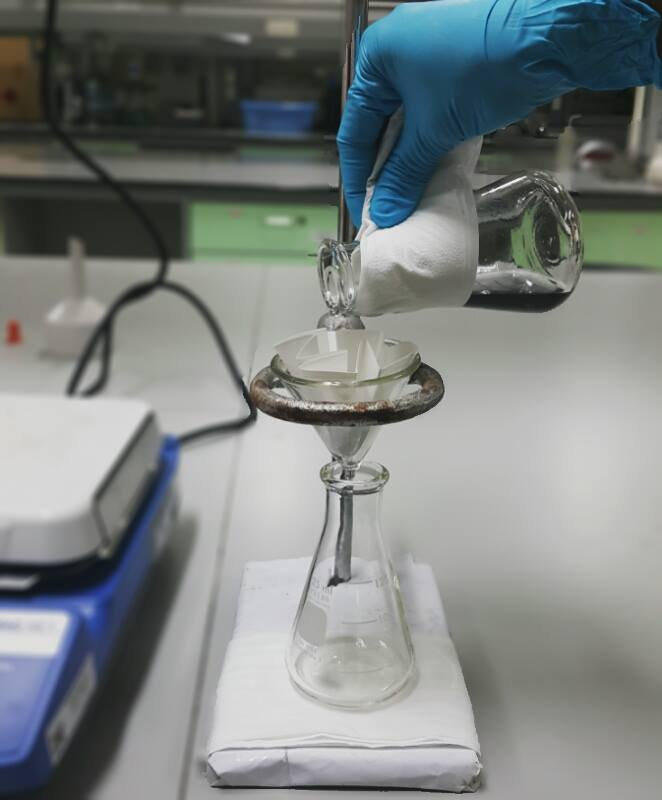
Hot filtration for the separation of solids from a hot solution

Hot filtration method is mainly used to separate solids from a hot solution. This is done to prevent crystal formation in the filter funnel and other apparatus that come in contact with the solution. As a result, the apparatus and the solution used are heated to prevent the rapid decrease in temperature which in turn, would lead to the crystallisation of the solids in the funnel and hinder the filtration process. One of the most important measures to prevent the formation of crystals in the funnel and to undergo effective hot filtration is the use stemless filter funnel. Due to the absence of a stem in the filter funnel, there is a decrease in the surface area of contact between the solution and the stem of the filter funnel, hence preventing re-crystallization of solid in the funnel, and adversely affecting the filtration process.

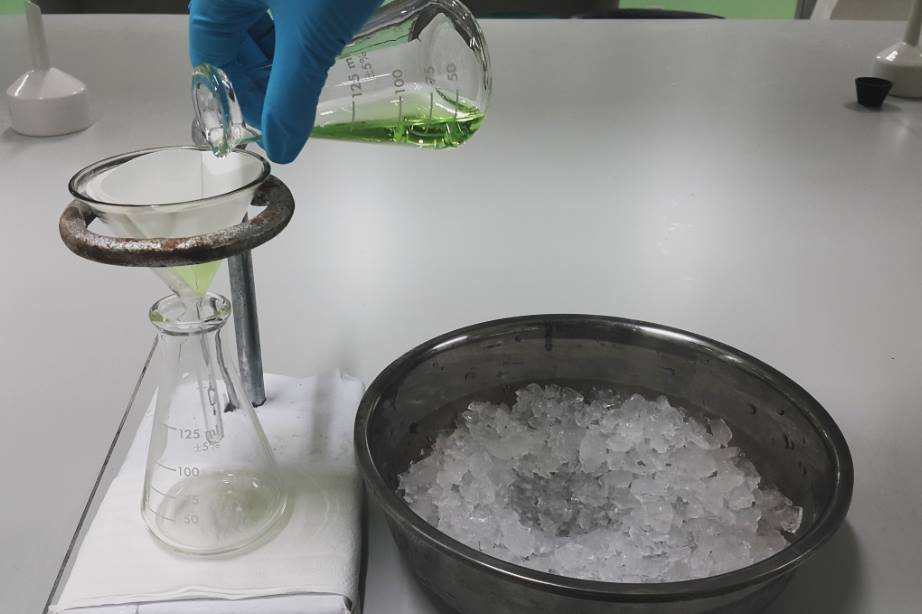
Cold filtration, the ice bath is used to cool down the temperature of the solution before undergoing the filtration process

Cold filtration method is the use of an ice bath to rapidly cool the solution to be crystallized rather than leaving it to cool slowly in the room atmosphere. This technique results in the formation of very small crystals as opposed to getting large crystals by cooling the solution at room temperature.

Vacuum filtration technique is mostly preferred for small batches of solution to dry small crystals quickly. This method requires a Büchner funnel, filter paper of a smaller diameter than the funnel, Büchner flask, and rubber tubing to connect to a vacuum source.

Centrifugal filtration is carried out by rapidly rotating the substance to be filtered. The more dense material is separated from the less dense matter by the horizontal rotation.

Gravity filtration is the process of pouring the mixture from a higher location to a lower one. It is frequently accomplished via simple filtration, which involves placing filter paper in a glass funnel with the liquid passing through by gravity while the insoluble solid particles are caught by the filter paper. Filter cones, fluted filters, or filtering pipets can all be employed, depending on the amount of the substance at hand. Gravity filtration is in widespread everyday use, for example for straining cooking water from food, or removing contaminants from a liquid.

=== Filtering force ===
Only when a driving force is supplied will the fluid to be filtered be able to flow through the filter media. Gravity, centrifugation, applying pressure to the fluid above the filter, applying a vacuum below the filter, or a combination of these factors may all contribute to this force. In both straightforward laboratory filtrations and massive sand-bed filters, gravitational force alone may be utilized. Centrifuges with a bowl holding a porous filter media can be thought of as filters in which a centrifugal force several times stronger than gravity replaces gravitational force. A partial vacuum is typically provided to the container below the filter media when laboratory filtration is challenging to speed up the filtering process. Depending on the type of filter being used, the majority of industrial filtration operations employ pressure or vacuum to speed up filtering and reduce the amount of equipment needed.

=== Filter media ===
Filter media are the materials used to do the separation of materials.

Two main types of filter media are employed in laboratories:

- Surface filters are solid sieves with a mesh to trap solid particles, sometimes with the aid of filter paper (e.g. Büchner funnel, belt filter, rotary vacuum-drum filter, cross-flow filters, screen filter).
- Depth filters, beds of granular material which retain the solid particles as they pass (e.g. sand filter).

Surface filters allow the solid particles, i.e. the residue, to be collected intact; depth filters do not. However, the depth filter is less prone to clogging due to the greater surface area where the particles can be trapped. Also, when the solid particles are very fine, it is often cheaper and easier to discard the contaminated granules than to clean the solid sieve. Filter media can be cleaned by rinsing with solvents or detergents or backwashing. Alternatively, in engineering applications, such as swimming pool water treatment plants, they may be cleaned by backwashing. Self-cleaning screen filters utilize point-of-suction backwashing to clean the screen without interrupting system flow.

==== Achieving flow through the filter ====
Fluids flow through a filter due to a pressure difference—fluid flows from the high-pressure side to the low-pressure side of the filter. The simplest method to achieve this is by gravity which can be seen in the coffeemaker example. In the laboratory, pressure in the form of compressed air on the feed side (or vacuum on the filtrate side) may be applied to make the filtration process faster, though this may lead to clogging or the passage of fine particles. Alternatively, the liquid may flow through the filter by the force exerted by a pump, a method commonly used in industry when a reduced filtration time is important. In this case, the filter need not be mounted vertically.

=== Filter aid ===
Certain filter aids may be used to aid filtration. These are often incompressible diatomaceous earth, or kieselguhr, which is composed primarily of silica. Also used are wood cellulose and other inert porous solids such as the cheaper and safer perlite. Activated carbon is often used in industrial applications that require changes in the filtrate's properties, such as altering colour or odour.

These filter aids can be used in two different ways. They can be used as a precoat before the slurry is filtered. This will prevent gelatinous-type solids from plugging the filter medium and also give a clearer filtrate. They can also be added to the slurry before filtration. This increases the porosity of the cake and reduces the resistance of the cake during filtration. In a rotary filter, the filter aid may be applied as a precoat; subsequently, thin slices of this layer are sliced off with the cake.

The use of filter aids is usually limited to cases where the cake is discarded or where the precipitate can be chemically separated from the filter.

=== Alternatives ===
Filtration is a more efficient method for the separation of mixtures than decantation but is much more time-consuming. If very small amounts of solution are involved, most of the solution may be soaked up by the filter medium.

An alternative to filtration is centrifugation. Instead of filtering the mixture of solid and liquid particles, the mixture is centrifuged to force the (usually) denser solid to the bottom, where it often forms a firm cake. The liquid above can then be decanted. This method is especially useful for separating solids that do not filter well, such as gelatinous or fine particles. These solids can clog or pass through the filter, respectively.

== Biological filtration ==
Biological filtration may take place inside an organism, or the biological component may be grown on a medium in the material being filtered. Removal of solids, emulsified components, organic chemicals and ions may be achieved by ingestion and digestion, adsorption or absorption. Because of the complexity of biological interactions, especially in multi-organism communities, it is often not possible to determine which processes are achieving the filtration result. At the molecular level, it may often be by individual catalytic enzyme actions within an individual organism. The waste products of some organisms may subsequently broken down by other organisms to extract as much energy as possible and in so doing reduce complex organic molecules to very simple inorganic species such as water, carbon dioxide and nitrogen.

=== Excretion ===
In mammals, reptiles, and birds, the kidneys function by renal filtration whereby the glomerulus selectively removes undesirable constituents such as urea, followed by selective reabsorption of many substances essential for the body to maintain homeostasis. The complete process is termed excretion by urination. Similar but often less complex solutions are deployed in all animals, even the protozoa, where the contractile vacuole provides a similar function.

=== Biofilms ===
Biofilms are often complex communities of bacteria, phages, yeasts and often more complex organisms including protozoa, rotifers and annelids which form dynamic and complex, frequently gelatinous films on wet substrates. Such biofilms coat the rocks of most rivers and the sea and they provide the key filtration capability of the Schmutzdecke on the surface of slow sand filters and the film on the filter media of trickling filters which are used to create potable water and treat sewage respectively.

An example of a biofilm is a biological slime, which may be found in lakes, rivers, rocks, etc. The utilization of single- or dual-species biofilms is a novel technology since natural biofilms are sluggishly developing. The use of biofilms in the biofiltration process allows for the attachment of desirable biomass and critical nutrients to immobilized support. So that water may be reused for various processes, advances in biofiltration methods assist in removing significant volumes of effluents from wastewater.

Systems for biologically treating wastewater are crucial for enhancing both human health and water quality. Biofilm technology, the formation of biofilms on various filter media, and other factors have an impact on the growth structure and function of these biofilms. To conduct a thorough investigation of the composition, diversity, and dynamics of biofilms, it also takes on a variety of traditional and contemporary molecular approaches.

=== Filter feeders ===
Filter feeders are organisms that obtain their food by filtering their, generally aquatic, environment. Many of the protozoa are filter feeders using a range of adaptations including rigid spikes of protoplasm held in the water flow as in the suctoria to various arrangements of beating cilia to direct particles to the mouth including organisms such as Vorticella which have a complex ring of cilia which create a vortex in the flow drafting particles into the oral cavity. Similar feeding techniques are used by the Rotifera and the Ectoprocta. Many aquatic arthropods are filter feeders. Some use rhythmical beating of abdominal limbs to create a water current to the mouth whilst the hairs on the legs trap any particle. Others such as some caddis flies spin fine webs in the water flow to trap particles.

== Examples ==
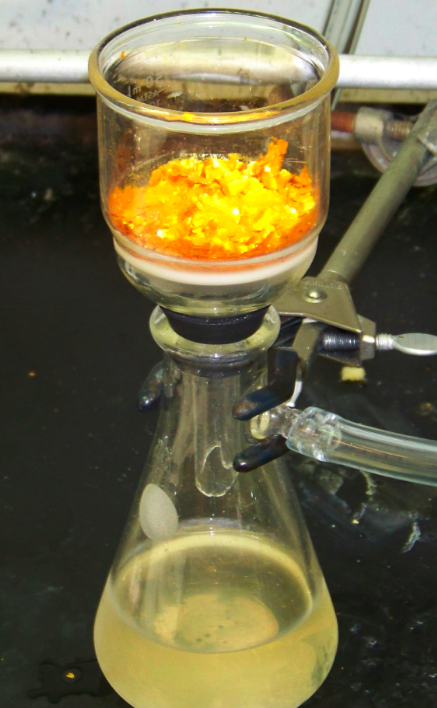
Filter flask (suction flask, with sintered glass filter containing sample). Note the almost colourless filtrate in the receiver flask.

Many filtration processes include more than one filtration mechanism, and particulates are often removed from the fluid first to prevent clogging of downstream elements.

Particulate filtration includes:

- The coffee filter to separate the coffee infusion from the grounds.
- HEPA filters in air conditioning to remove particles from air.
- Belt filters to extract precious metals in mining.
- Vertical plate filter such as those used in Merrill–Crowe process.
- The Nutsche filter is typically used in pharmaceutical applications or batch processes that need to capture solids.
- Furnaces use filtration to prevent the furnace elements from fouling with particulates.
- A pneumatic conveying system such as an industrial exhaust duct system often employs filtration to stop or slow the flow of unwanted material that is transported, through the use of a baghouse.
- In the laboratory, a Büchner funnel is often used, with a filter paper serving as the porous barrier.
- Air filters are commonly used to remove airborne particulate matter in building ventilation systems, combustion engines, and industrial processes.
- Oil filter in automobiles, often as a canister or cartridge.
- Aquarium filter
- Straining water from food with a colander

Adsorption filtration removes contaminants by adsorption of the contaminant by the filter medium. This requires intimate contact between the filter medium and the filtrate, and takes time for diffusion to bring the contaminant into direct contact with the medium while passing through it, referred to as dwell time. Slower flow also reduces pressure drop across the filter. Applications include:

- Carbon dioxide removal from breathing gas in rebreathers and life-support systems using scrubber filters,
- Activated carbon filters to remove volatile hydrocarbons, odours, and other contaminants from recirculated breathing gas in closed habitats.

Combined applications include:

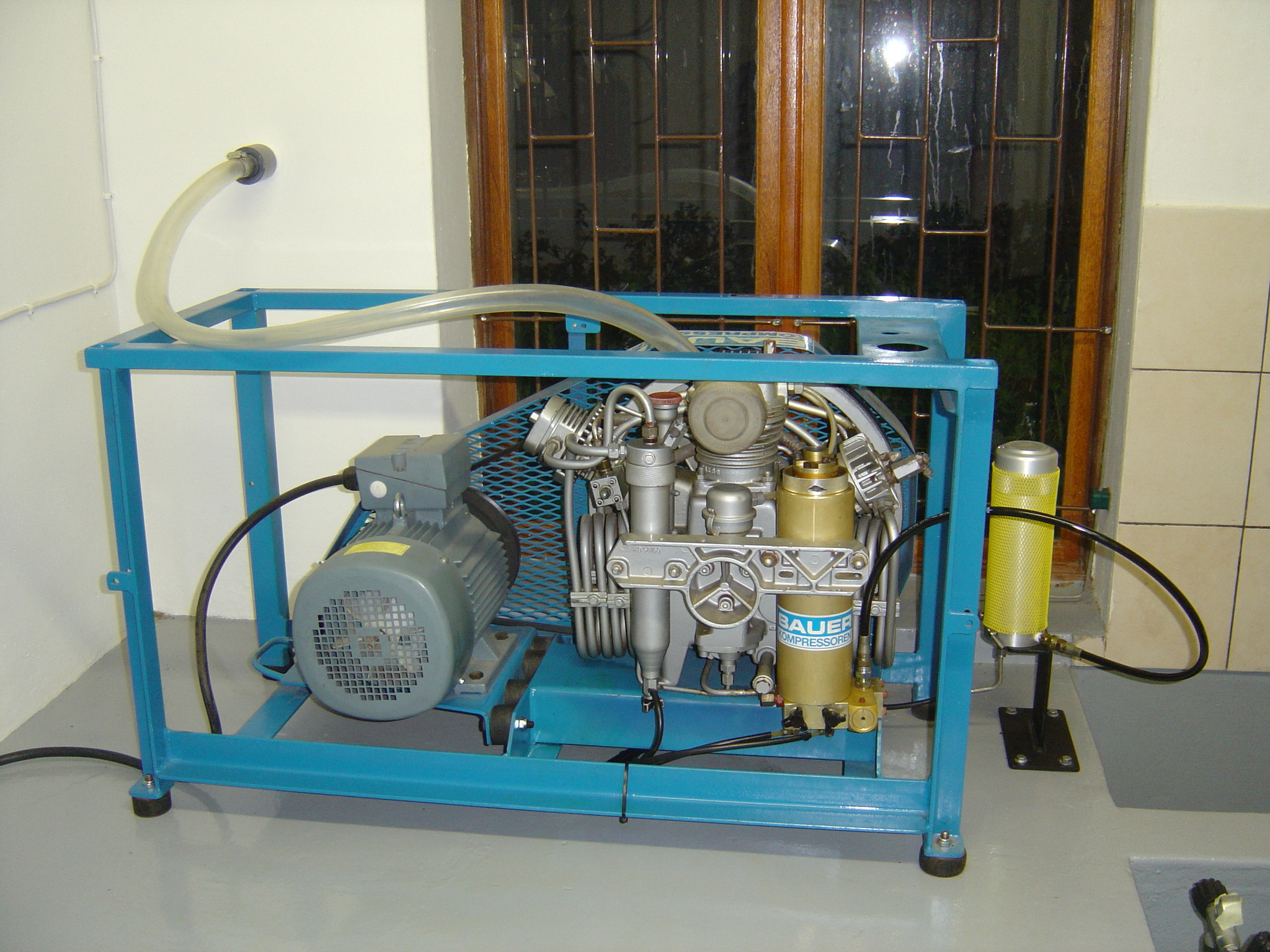
Small stationary Bauer HP breathing air compressor installation showing water separator (centre), and two high-pressure product filter housings (gold anodised) to produce oxygen compatible breathing air for diving gas mixtures.

- Compressed breathing air production, where the air passes through a particulate filter before entering the compressor, which removes particles likely to damage the compressor, followed by droplet separation after post-compression cooling and final product adsorption filtration to remove gaseous hydrocarbons contaminants and excessive water vapour. In some cases prefilters using adsorption media are used to control carbon dioxide levels, pressure swing adsorption may be used to increase oxygen fraction, and where the risk of carbon monoxide contamination exists, hopcalite catalytic converters may be included in the filtration media of the product. All these processes are broadly referred to as aspects of the filtration of the product.
- Potable water treatment using biofilm filtration in slow sand filters.
- Wastewater treatment using biofilm filtration using trickling filters.

== See also ==
- Separation process – Method that converts a mixture or solution into two or more distinct products
- Microfiltration – Physical process where a fluid is passed through a special pore-sized membrane
- Ultrafiltration – Filtration by force through a semipermeable membrane
- Nanofiltration – Filtration method that uses nanometer sized pores in biological membranes
- Reverse osmosis – Water purification process
- Cross-flow filtration – Filtration technique
- Sieve – Tool for separation of solid materials by particle size
- Sieve analysis – Procedure to assess particle size distribution
