= Agitated Nutsche filter =

Type of filter for liquid

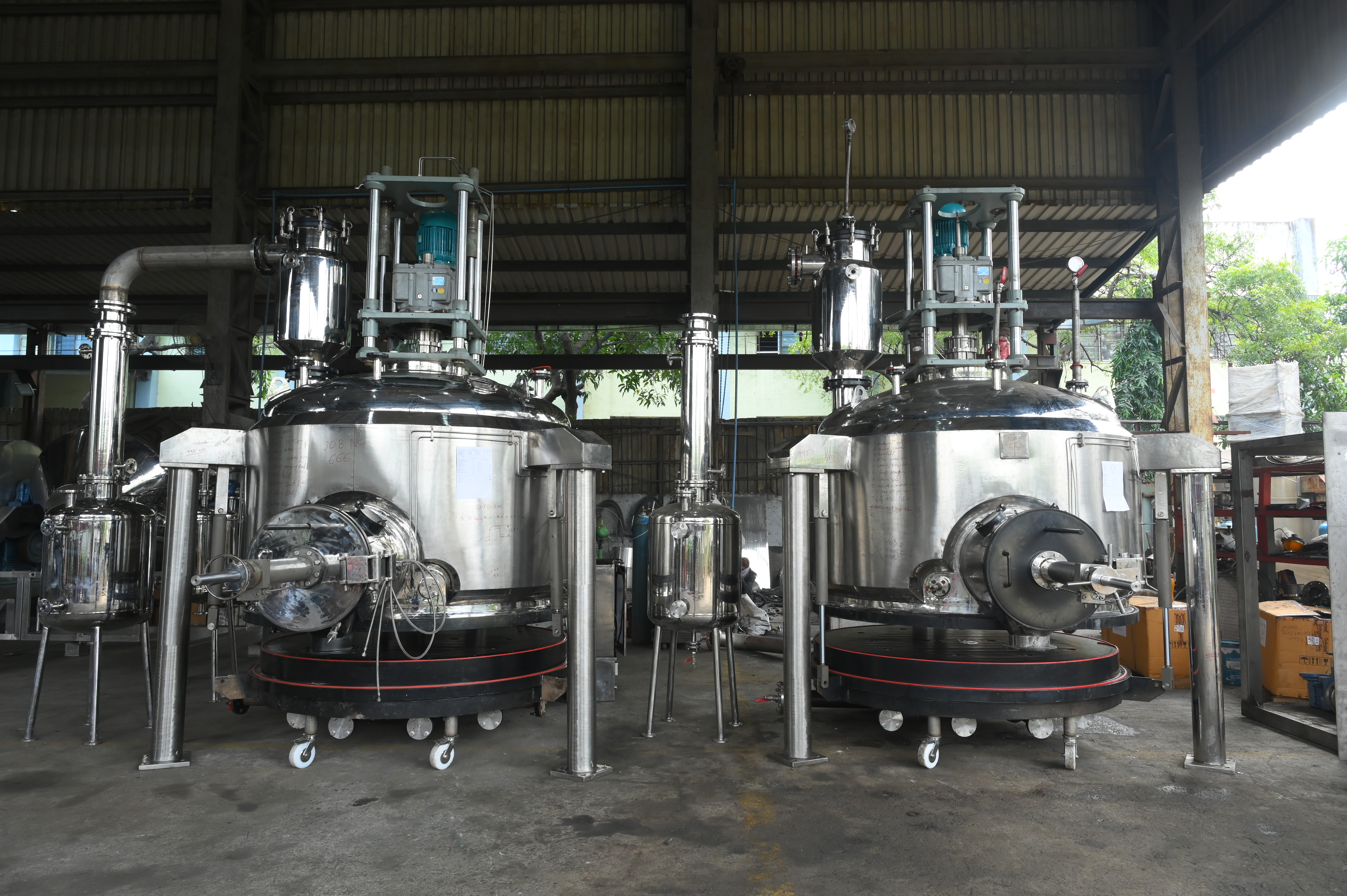
Agitated Nutsche filter dryer

The agitated Nutsche filter dryer (ANFD) is a filtration and drying technique used in applications such as dye, paint, and pharmaceutical production and in waste water treatment. Safety requirements and environmental concerns due to solvent evaporation led to the development of this type of filter wherein filtration under vacuum or pressure can be carried out in closed vessels and solids can be discharged straightaway into a dryer.

== Filter features ==
A typical unit consists of a dished vessel with a perforated plate. The entire vessel can be kept at the desired temperature by using a limpet jacket, jacketed bottom dish and stirrer (blade and shaft) through which heat transfer media can flow. The vessel can be made completely leak-proof for vacuum or pressure service. It is used for multiple processes including solid liquid separation, agitating/washing, resuspending/mixing extraction, crystallizing, and drying which can all be performed within a closed system.

== Nutsche filter disc ==
The filter disc is the bottom porous plate of the Nutsche filter. The filter disc retains the solids and lets the liquid/ gas passing through. It is the main filtration component of the Nutsche filter.

Types of the filter disc:

- Perforated support plate with filter mesh (metallic or non-metallic)
- Welded multi-layer mesh
- Sintered wire mesh

== Agitator ==
A multipurpose agitator is the unique feature of this system. The agitator performs a number of operations through movement in axes both parallel and perpendicular to the shaft.

Important points

- Slurry contents can be kept liquidized using heat and agitation until most of the liquid is filtered through.
- When filtration is complete, the cake develops cracks causing upsets in the vacuum operation. This hinders removal of mother liquor. The agitator can be used to maintain a uniform cake.
- The cake can be washed after filtration by re-slurrying the cake.
- After washing, the mother liquor can be refiltered. The cake can then be discharged by lowering the agitator and rotating it in such a manner that it brings all the cake towards the discharge port.
- Agitator filters are suitable for filtration of liquids with a high solid content. The liquid is separated mechanically using a permeable layer/ filter medium under vacuum or pressure.
- A special height-adjustable agitator design improvises the degree of filtration effectiveness and enables the mechanical discharge of the solid. An even filter cake forms on the horizontal base of the filter, which ensures the best possible recovery of the solid

== Power pack ==
A hydraulic power pack or hydraulic power unit is a unit attached to the ANF's agitator system, discharge valve and bottom removal (for cleaning). It consists of an oil tank on which a pump is provided for circulating high-pressure oil through a control valve system and to hydraulic cylinders. These cylinders are provided for vertical movement of the agitator, discharge product and sometimes detach the bottom to clean the filter before changing the product. Operating pressure of the oil varies from 2 kg/cm^{2} to 80 kg/cm^{2} (200 kPa to 8 MPa).

== Materials of construction ==
Agitated Nutsche filters can be fabricated in materials like Hastelloy C-276, C-22, stainless steel, mild steel, and mild steel with rubber lining as per service requirements. Recently, agitated Nutsche filters have been fabricated out of polypropylene fiber-reinforced plastic (PPFRP). Also, Nutsche filters made from borosilicate glass 3.3 find use in applications where visibility of process are important along with chemical inertness.

== Advantages ==
- Vacuum or pressure filtration possible.
- Inert gas atmosphere can be maintained.
- Minimal contamination of the cake.
- Very high solvent recovery.
- Considerable saving in manpower.
- Solvents are in closed systems, so no toxic vapors are let off in the atmosphere.
- Personal safety is maintained and heat transfer surfaces can be provided to maintain filtration temperature.

== Commercial uses ==
Agitated Nutsche filter dyers are widely used in the pharmaceutical, chemical, and fine chemical industries for solid-liquid separation under vacuum or pressure. These systems combine filtration, washing, and drying in a single, closed vessel—ensuring safe, contamination-free processing of sensitive or hazardous materials. ANFDs are ideal for batch processing of high-purity APIs and specialty chemicals where product recovery and minimal human exposure are critical.

ANFD systems are particularly suited for liquids with a high solid content, where the liquid phase is mechanically separated through a permeable filter medium under vacuum or pressure. The height-adjustable agitator optimizes filtration, enabling uniform filter cake formation on the horizontal base of the filter, ensuring superior solid recovery. The system also supports the mechanical discharge of solids, making it highly efficient for production.
