= Büchner flask =

Laboratory glassware: filtration apparatus

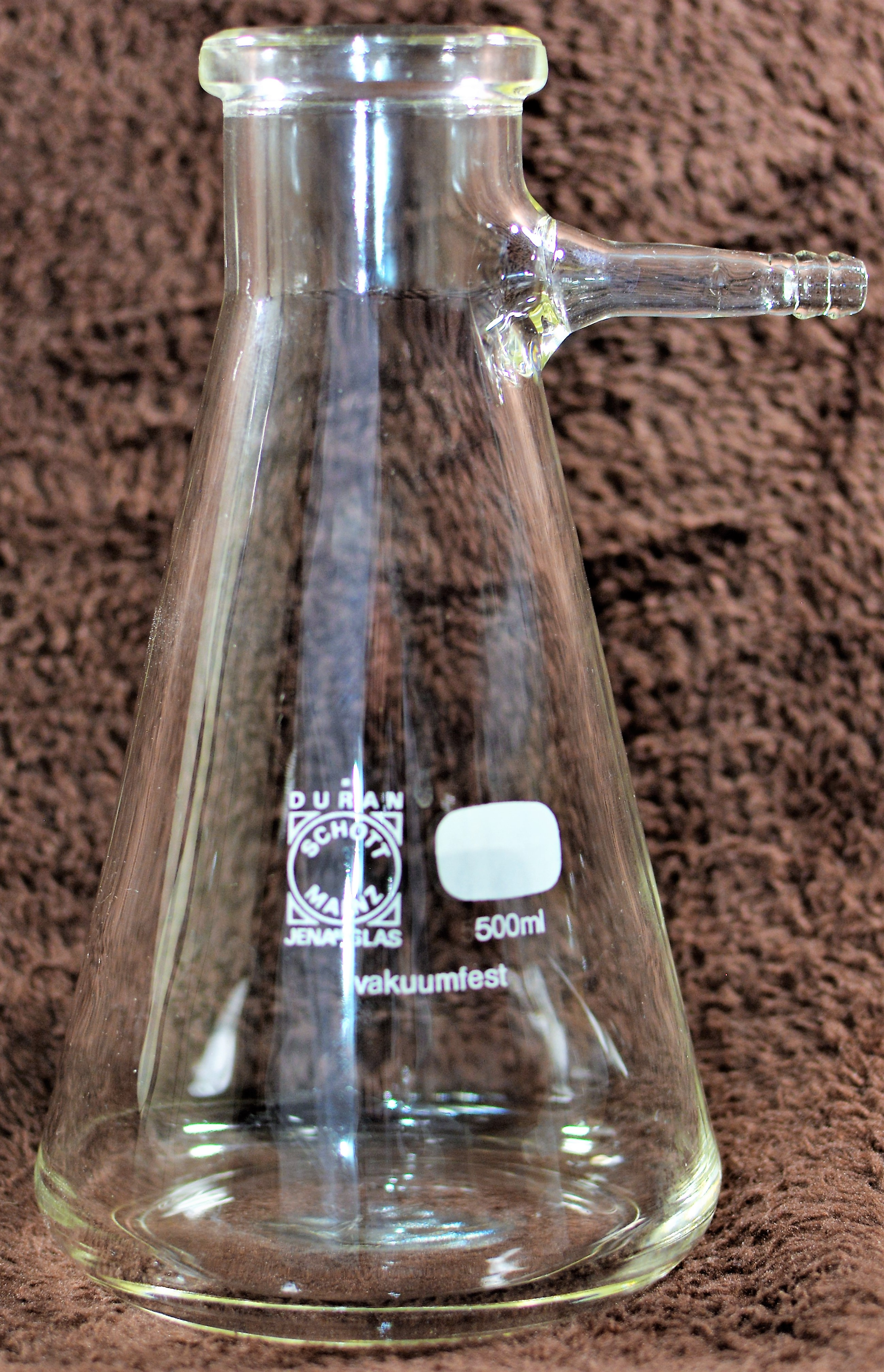
Büchner flask

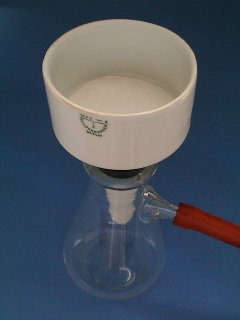
A Büchner funnel is attached to the flask via a black elastomer adapter. The hose barb is connected via vacuum hose to a vacuum source such as an aspirator. The flask should be clamped before use or the hose will likely cause it to tip.

A Büchner flask, also known as a vacuum flask, filter flask, suction flask, side-arm flask, or Bunsen flask, is a thick-walled Erlenmeyer flask with a short glass tube and hose barb protruding about 1-2 cm from its neck.

== Description ==
The short tube and hose barb effectively act as an adapter over which the end of a thick-walled hose can be fitted to form a connection to the flask. The other end of the hose can be connected to source of vacuum such as an aspirator, vacuum pump, or house vacuum. Preferably this is done through a trap (see below), which is designed to prevent the water to be sucked back from the aspirator into the Büchner flask. The purpose of applying a vacuum is to speed the filtration by providing a pressure differential across the filter medium that is greater than that produced by gravity alone.

== Operation ==
The thick wall of the Büchner flask provides it the strength to withstand the pressure difference while holding a vacuum inside. It is primarily used together with a Büchner funnel fitted through a drilled rubber bung or an elastomer adapter (a Büchner ring) at the neck on top of the flask for the filtration of samples. The Büchner funnel holds the sample isolated from the suction by a layer of filter paper. During filtration, the filtrate enters and is held by the flask while the residue remains on the filter paper in the funnel.

The Büchner flask can also be used as a vacuum trap in a vacuum line to ensure that no fluids are carried over from the aspirator or vacuum pump (or other vacuum source) to the evacuated apparatus or vice versa.

== Name ==
Although commonly referred to as the Büchner flask in English-speaking contexts, the flask was not invented by Ernst Büchner. The design, featuring a thick-walled vessel with a side-arm for vacuum filtration, was introduced by Japanese bacteriologist Shibasaburo Kitasato in the late 19th century. The misattribution likely arose because the flask is typically used in conjunction with the Büchner funnel, which was invented by Ernst Büchner. Over time, the funnel's name became colloquially associated with the entire vacuum filtration apparatus, including the flask. In Japan and other scientific communities, the flask is more accurately referred to as the Kitasato flask in recognition of its true origin.
