= LHASA =

LHASA (Logic and Heuristics Applied to Synthetic Analysis) is a computer program developed in 1971 by the research group of Elias James Corey at the Harvard University Department of Chemistry. The program uses artificial intelligence techniques to discover sequences of reactions which may be used to synthesize a molecule. This program was one of the first to use a graphical interface to input and display chemical structures.
