= Chemical synthesis =

Planned series of chemical reactions to produce desired product(s)

Chemical synthesis (chemical combination) is the artificial execution of chemical reactions to obtain one or more products. This occurs by physical and chemical manipulations, usually involving one or more reactions. In modern laboratory uses, the process is reproducible and reliable.

A chemical synthesis involves one or more compounds (known as reagents or reactants) that will experience a transformation under certain conditions. Various reaction types can be applied to formulate a desired product. Many reactions require some form of processing ("work-up") or purification procedure to isolate the final product.

The amount produced by chemical synthesis is known as the reaction yield. Typically, yields are expressed as a mass in grams (in a laboratory setting) or as a percentage of the total theoretical quantity that could be produced based on the limiting reagent. A side reaction is an unwanted chemical reaction that can reduce the desired yield. The word synthesis was used first in a chemical context by the chemist Hermann Kolbe.

== Strategies ==
Chemical synthesis employs various strategies to achieve efficient and precise molecular transformations that are more complex than simply converting a reactant A to a reaction product B directly. These strategies can be grouped into approaches for managing reaction sequences.

=== Reaction sequences ===
Multistep synthesis involves sequential chemical reactions, each requiring its own work-up to isolate intermediates before proceeding to the next stage. For example, the synthesis of paracetamol typically requires three separate reactions. Divergent synthesis starts with a common intermediate, which branches into multiple final products through distinct reaction pathways. Convergent synthesis involves the combination of multiple intermediates synthesized independently to create a complex final product. One-pot synthesis involves multiple reactions in the same vessel, allowing sequential transformations without intermediate isolation, reducing material loss, time, and the need for additional purification. Cascade reactions, a specific type of one-pot synthesis, streamline the process further by enabling consecutive transformations within a single reactant, minimizing resource consumption.

=== Catalytic strategies ===
Catalysts play a vital role in chemical synthesis by accelerating reactions and enabling specific transformations. Photoredox catalysis provides enhanced control over reaction conditions by regulating the activation of small molecules and the oxidation state of metal catalysts. Biocatalysis uses enzymes as catalysts to speed up chemical reactions with high specificity under mild conditions.

=== Reactivity control ===
Chemoselectivity ensures that a specific functional group in a molecule reacts while others remain unaffected. Protecting groups temporarily mask reactive sites to enable selective reactions. Kinetic control prioritizes reaction pathways that form products quickly, often yielding less stable compounds. In contrast, thermodynamic control favors the formation of the most stable products.

=== Advanced planning and techniques ===
Retrosynthetic analysis is a strategy used to plan complex syntheses by breaking down the target molecule into simpler precursors. Flow chemistry is a continuous reaction method where reactants are pumped through a reactor, allowing precise control over reaction conditions and scalability. This approach has been employed in the large-scale production of pharmaceuticals such as Tamoxifen.

== Organic synthesis ==
Organic synthesis is a special type of chemical synthesis dealing with the synthesis of organic compounds. For the total synthesis of a complex product, multiple procedures in sequence may be required to synthesize the product of interest, needing a lot of time. A purely synthetic chemical synthesis begins with basic lab compounds. A semisynthetic process starts with natural products from plants or animals and then modifies them into new compounds.

== Inorganic synthesis ==
Inorganic synthesis and organometallic synthesis are used to prepare compounds with significant non-organic content. An illustrative example is the preparation of the anti-cancer drug cisplatin from potassium tetrachloroplatinate.

== Green chemistry ==
Chemical synthesis using green chemistry promotes the design of new synthetic methods and apparatus that simplify operations and seeks environmentally benign solvents. Key principles include atom economy, which aims to incorporate all reactant atoms into the final product, and the reduction of waste and inefficiencies in chemical processes. Innovations in green chemistry, contribute to more sustainable and efficient chemical synthesis, reducing the environmental and health impacts of traditional methods.

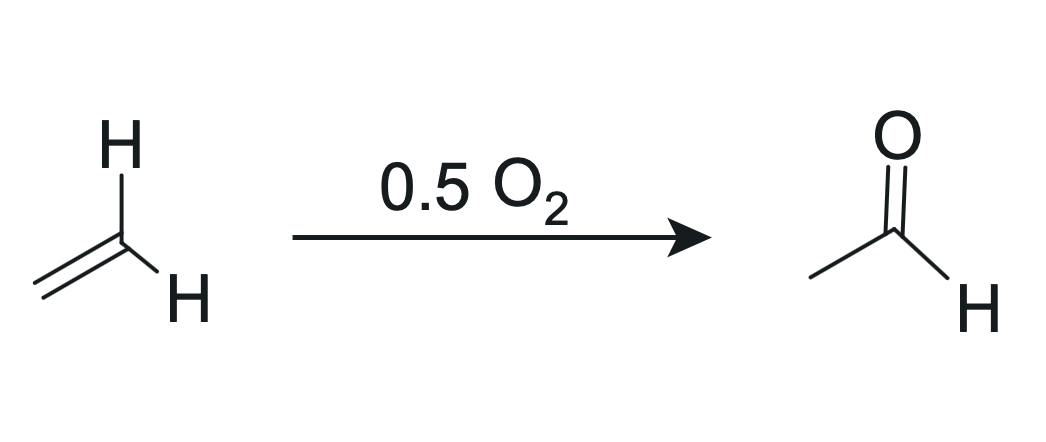
Traditional synthesis of acetic acid using the Wacker Process

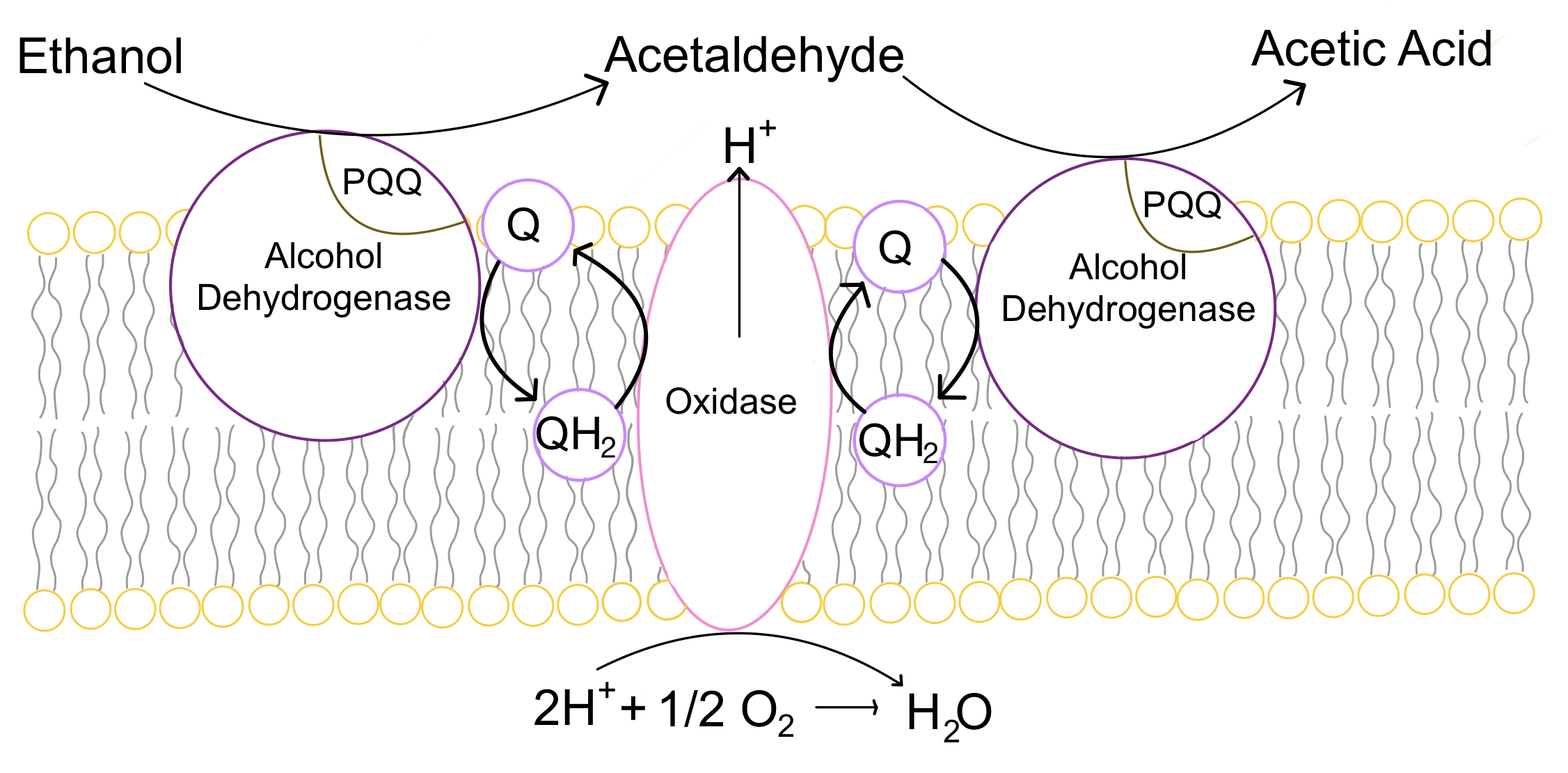
Green synthesis of acetic acid using Acetobacter

== Applications ==
Chemical synthesis plays a crucial role across various industries, enabling the development of materials, medicines, and technologies with significant real-world impacts.

Catalysis: The development of catalysts is vital for numerous industrial processes, including petroleum refining, petrochemical production, and pollution control. Catalysts synthesized through chemical processes enhance the efficiency and sustainability of these operations.

Medicine: Organic synthesis plays a vital role in drug discovery, allowing chemists to develop and optimize new drugs by modifying organic molecules. Additionally, the synthesis of metal complexes for medical imaging and cancer treatments is a key application of chemical synthesis, enabling advanced diagnostic and therapeutic techniques.

Biopharmaceuticals: Chemical synthesis is critical in the production of biopharmaceuticals, including monoclonal antibodies and other biologics. Chemical synthesis enables the creation and modification of organic and biologically sourced compounds used in these treatments. Advanced techniques, such as DNA recombinant technology and cell fusion, rely on chemical synthesis to produce biologics tailored for specific diseases, ensuring they work effectively and target diseases precisely.

== See also ==
- Beilstein database
- Biosynthesis
- Chemical engineering
- Click chemistry
- Electrosynthesis
- Methods in Organic Synthesis
- Organic synthesis
- Peptide synthesis
- Total synthesis
- Automated synthesis
