= Minnigerode =

Minnigerode is a surname. Notable people with this name include:

- Bernhard Minnigerode (1837–1896), German mathematician, mineralogist and Alpine climber
- Charles Minnigerode (1814–1894), German-born American professor and clergyman
- Lucy Minnigerode (1871-1935), American nurse
- Marietta Minnigerode Andrews (born Marietta Fauntleroy Minnigerode, 1869-1931), American painter and designer
- Meade Minnigerode (1887–1967), American writer
- Patricia Minnigerode (died 1952), first wife of Arthur Ponsonby, 11th Earl of Bessborough

== See also ==
- Charles Minnigerode Beckwith (1851-1928), American bishop
