= Charles Minnigerode =

German-born American professor and clergyman

The Reverend Charles Minnigerode
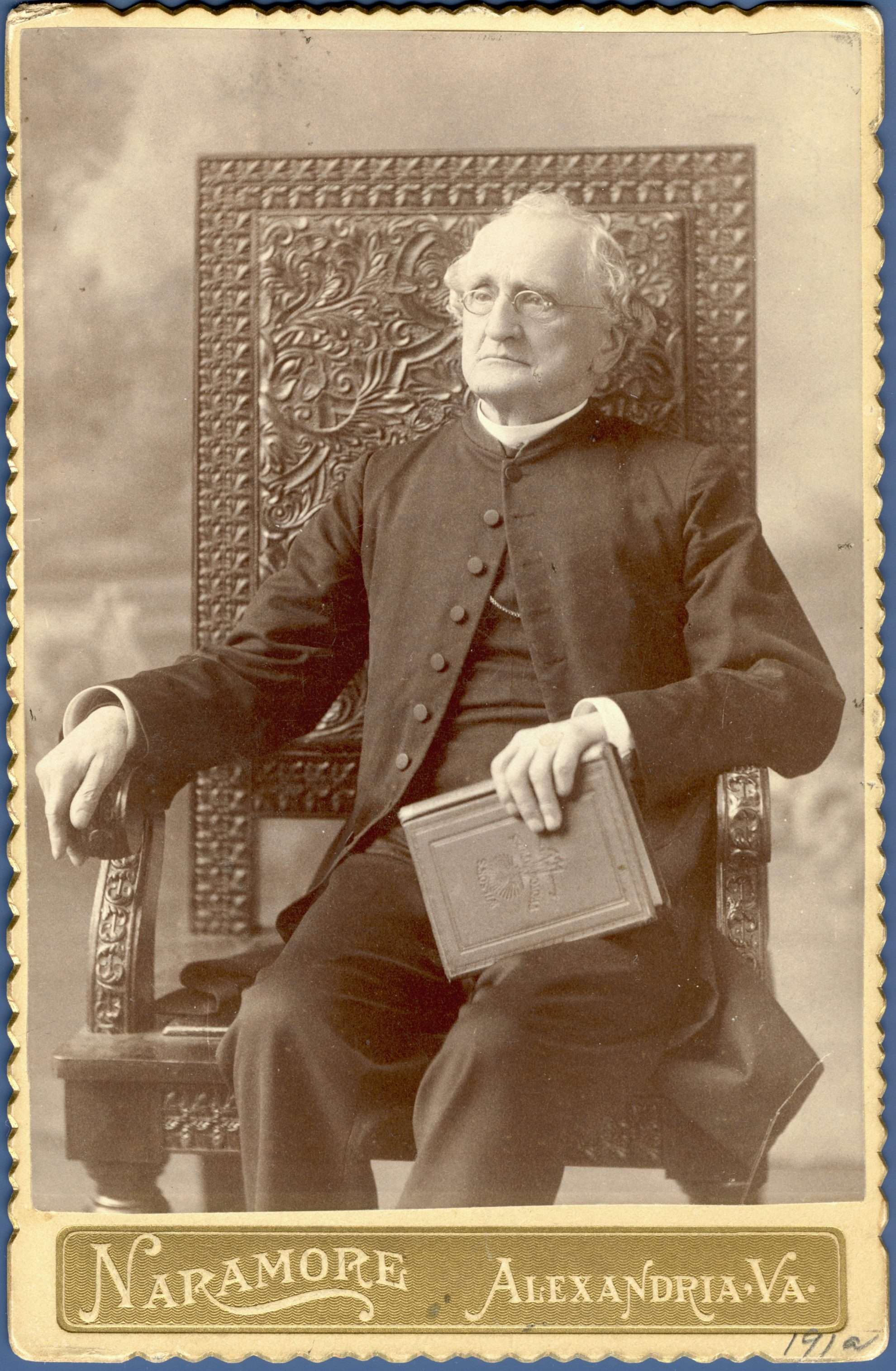
- Born: August 6, 1814; Arnsberg, Westphalia
- Died: October 13, 1894 (aged 80); Alexandria, Virginia, US
- Education: University of Giessen
- Occupations: Cleric; academic

Ecclesiastical career
- Religion: Christian (Episcopalian)
- Church: Protestant Episcopal Church in the United States of America; Protestant Episcopal Church in the Confederate States of America
- Ordained: 1847
- Offices held: Rector of St. Paul's Episcopal Church (Richmond, Virginia)

Charles Frederick Ernest Minnigerode (born Karl Friedrich Ernst Minnigerode, August 6, 1814 – October 13, 1894) was a German-American revolutionary, professor, and Episcopal clergyman. He is credited with introducing the Christmas tree tradition to Williamsburg, Virginia, and served for thirty-three years as rector of St. Paul's Episcopal Church in Richmond, Virginia, which was known during the Civil War as the "Cathedral of the Confederacy." Among his parishioners were Confederate president Jefferson Davis, whom Minnigerode baptized in 1862, and General Robert E. Lee. He was a professor of Latin and Greek at the College of William & Mary from 1842 to 1848, and later served on the college's Board of Visitors from 1871 to 1893.

== Early life and revolutionary activity ==
Minnigerode was born on August 6, 1814, in Arnsberg, Westphalia (in present-day Germany), and grew up in the nearby city of Darmstadt, in the Grand Duchy of Hesse. He was confirmed in the Lutheran Church and received his first communion at the age of fifteen. He received a classical education and at fourteen entered the Gymnasium in Darmstadt, where he became acquainted with the future playwright Georg Büchner.

In 1832, Minnigerode entered the University of Giessen, where he studied law. There he renewed his friendship with Büchner, who was by then deeply involved in radical politics. Both became members of a secret society that Büchner helped found. In 1834, Büchner and the Butzbach pastor Friedrich Ludwig Weidig wrote the inflammatory political pamphlet Der Hessische Landbote (The Hessian Courier), which called for revolution against the Grand Duke of Hesse-Darmstadt. On August 1, 1834, a police informant exposed the society. Minnigerode was found in possession of copies of the pamphlet and arrested.

He spent the next several years in various prisons, denied all reading material except the Bible, which he later recalled having read eight times during his incarceration. Büchner, who had escaped to Switzerland, wrote in 1839 that he had heard Minnigerode was "being tortured to death." In fact, Minnigerode had been released after approximately eighteen months, first to house arrest at his brother's home, then at his father's, owing to deteriorating health. Once free of house arrest, Minnigerode concluded he would always be under suspicion in Germany and emigrated to the United States, landing in Philadelphia, Pennsylvania. He mastered English within approximately three months and initially found work teaching Greek, Latin, Hebrew, and German.

== Academic life in Williamsburg ==
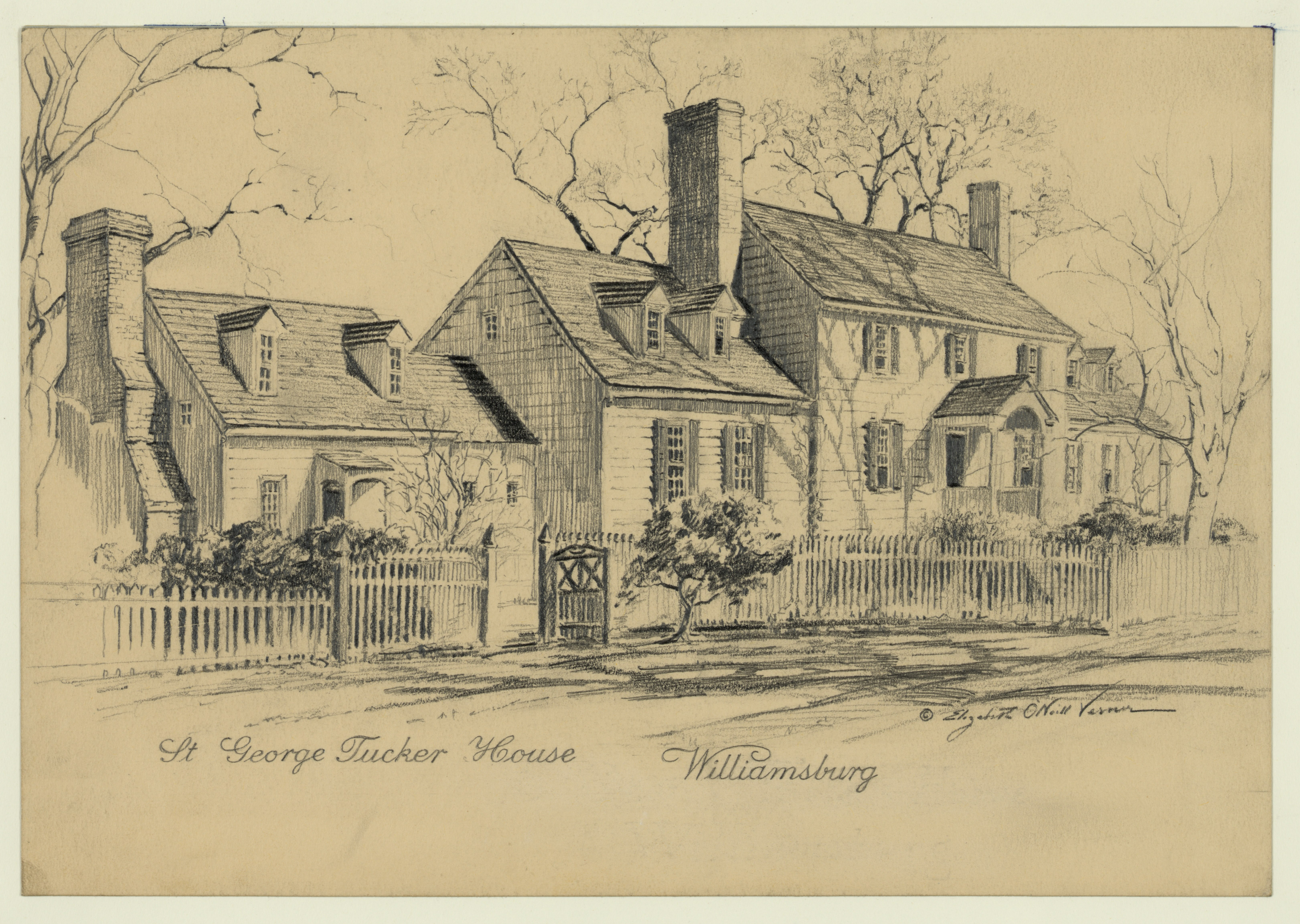
The St. George Tucker House, where Minnigerode introduced Williamsburg's first Christmas tree in 1842

=== Happy Years at William & Mary ===
In July 1842, the Board of Visitors of the College of William & Mary selected Minnigerode for its professorship of classical humanities—defeating approximately thirty other candidates—on the basis of his extraordinary credentials. William and Mary President Thomas R. Dew wrote that Minnigerode "seems to be a very amiable little gentleman, & is deeply embrued with all the German literature." He would be tasked with teaching Latin, Greek, and Hebrew.

Minnigerode quickly became a popular figure in Williamsburg society. He formed a close friendship with Nathaniel Beverley Tucker, professor of law at William & Mary, and boarded with Tucker's family on Nicholson Street in the house now known as the St. George Tucker House, a property of Colonial Williamsburg. In 1842, during his first Christmas season with the Tucker family, Minnigerode introduced the children to the German custom of the Weihnachtsbaum. He led the Tucker children into the woods to cut a small evergreen, which was brought inside and placed on a parlor table. Since there were no ready-made ornaments, Minnigerode helped the children create their own decorations, including strings of popcorn, gilded nuts, cut paper, and small candles fastened to the branches.

While teaching at William & Mary, he began a transition to the Episcopal priesthood: in 1844 he was confirmed at Bruton Parish Church and by 1847 he was ordained to the priesthood.

=== The Troubles of 1848 ===
In the summer of 1846, William & Mary president Thomas R. Dew unexpectedly died. By a single vote, a divided Board of Visitors chose Robert Saunders Jr., chair of mathematics, as the new president of the college. They next hire was easy: George Frederick Holmes, a native of British Guyana, was appointed to take over Dew's responsibilities for political economy and history. The third hire—Dew's replacement for the chair of moral philosophy—proved disastrous.

The Board's first choice, and the faculty favorite, was Landon C. Garland, former president of Randolph-Macon College. He declined with regret—he had already accepted a position at the University of Alabama. That meant the job would go to Archibald Peachy, a virtually unknown scholar who had been one of Tucker's students. He also happened to be the son of a former Visitor. Saunders and Peachy had great animosity for one another, and the faculty, who had been keen on Garland and believed Peachy's appointment to be the result of nepotism, were, with the exception of Tucker, strongly opposed to their new colleague. Saunders resigned and the college descended into chaos and mutual recrimination. Holmes noted the Board's growing antipathy for the non-American faculty (including Minnigerode) who opposed Peachy, and announced his departure. Meanwhile, Tucker accused Minnigerode and fellow professor John Millington of "seeking to undermine and destroy" William & Mary and claimed that they were trying to found a new college in Richmond. Minnigerode challenged Tucker to prove his accusation before the Board—Tucker recanted.

In any event, in 1848, the Board asked for the resignations of all its professors and abolished the students' secret societies (suspected of some role in the conflict over Peachy). The professors were allowed to reapply for their chairs, though they had to affirm that they could work with Peachy. Minnigerode, who had never before hidden his contempt for his young colleague, said that they could be amiable, but Peachy denied this. The Board reappointed Peachy, Tucker, Millington, and Holmes. It voted to permanently dismiss Minnigerode—a decision which, alongside the reappointment of Peachy, caused three Visitors to resign. The following year, Peachy quit, and Millington and Holmes left to join the new University of Mississippi.

== Early parish ministry ==
After resigning from William & Mary in 1848, Minnigerode accepted the pastorate of Merchants Hope Episcopal Church and Martin's Brandon Episcopal Church in Prince George County, Virginia, where he remained until 1853. He then moved to Freemason Episcopal Church in Norfolk, Virginia, then the largest congregation in the Diocese of Virginia, where he served until 1856. During this period, Minnigerode also preached occasionally in Williamsburg.

== Rector of St. Paul's, Richmond ==
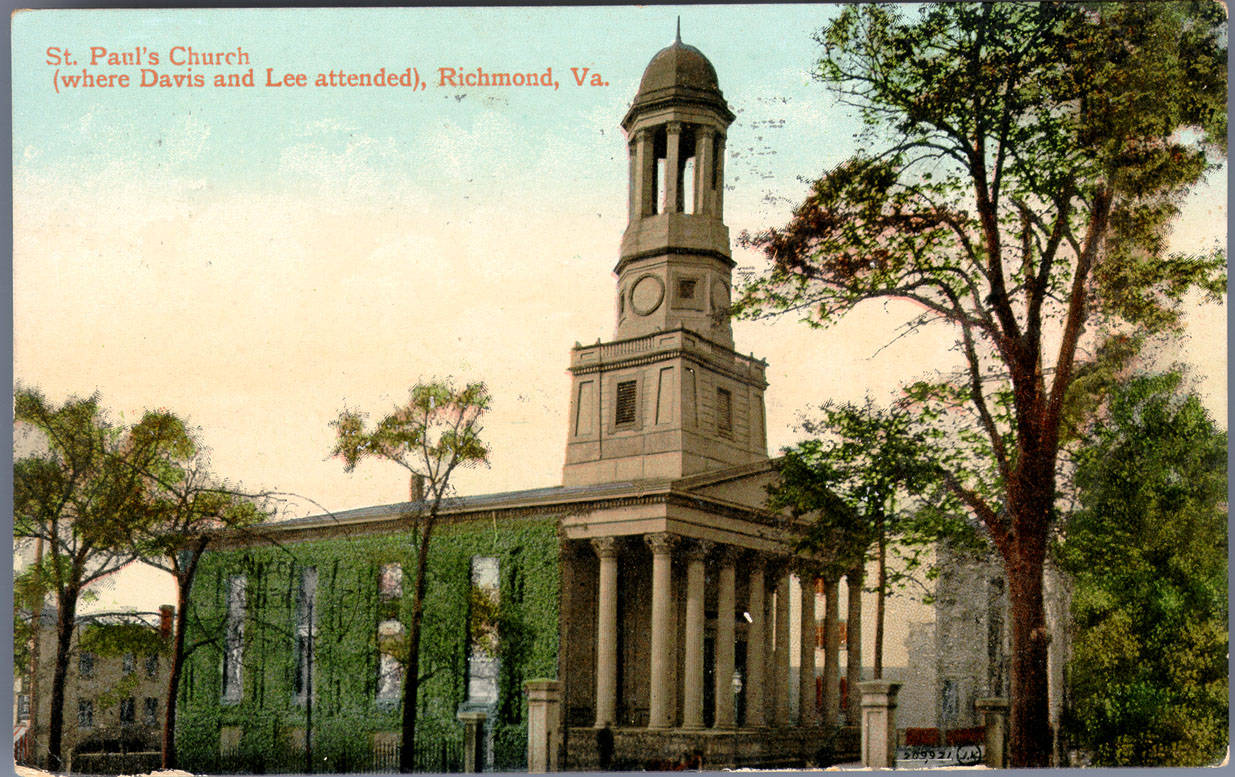
St. Paul's Church, where Minnigerode served as rector for more than 30 years

In 1856, Minnigerode was appointed rector of St. Paul's Episcopal Church in Richmond, Virginia. Though he retained a German accent throughout his life, Minnigerode was widely admired as a preacher and drew large congregations. Many of the first families of Richmond were regular attendees, as were prominent figures from across Virginia. In 1858, Minnigerode presided over the reinterment ceremony for the remains of President James Monroe, whose body was moved from New York to Hollywood Cemetery in Richmond. In 1860, Minnigerode preached to the Prince of Wales—the future King Edward VII—when the prince attended St. Paul's during his tour of the United States.

=== Civil War ministry ===
When the Confederate capital relocated to Richmond in May 1861, St. Paul's became the de facto "Cathedral of the Confederacy," and Minnigerode found himself at the spiritual center of Confederate leadership. His congregation included Confederate president Jefferson Davis and, when in Richmond, General Robert E. Lee. On Davis's advice, Minnigerode invoked divine blessing on the Confederacy publicly at Davis's presidential inauguration ceremony on February 22, 1862. In May 1862, Minnigerode baptized Davis and administered his first communion at St. Paul's. He was a frequent pastoral visitor to the Davis household throughout the war, though he later wrote: "I never meddled with his policy or measures of his government; still less did I ever use his confidence for any personal purposes. Mr. Davis was not the man for that."

In May 1864, Minnigerode read prayers at the burial of Confederate Major General J. E. B. Stuart. On January 1, 1865, amid great uncertainty about the Confederacy's future, Minnigerode preached a sermon at St. Paul's entitled "He That Believeth Shall Not Make Haste," published the same year by Richmond printer Chas. H. Wynne. In it he urged his congregation to maintain faith and composure: "If we fall, let us fall with our faces upward, our hearts turned to God, our hands in the work, our wounds in the breast." On Sunday morning, April 2, 1865, Minnigerode was preaching on the Last Supper at St. Paul's when church sexton William Irving walked down the center aisle and handed Davis a dispatch from Confederate Secretary of War John C. Breckinridge relaying a telegram from General Lee that Union forces had broken through the lines at Petersburg and that Richmond must be evacuated.

=== Post-war ministry and relationship with Jefferson Davis ===
After the war, during Davis's imprisonment at Fort Monroe, Minnigerode visited him periodically to offer spiritual encouragement and to administer communion. When Davis was released in May 1867, Minnigerode personally escorted him from Fort Monroe to Richmond's Spotswood Hotel. Minnigerode continued as rector through the Reconstruction era and remained a prominent figure in Richmond's religious and civic life. Notably, in 1868, he officiated the wedding of the parents of W.A.R. Goodwin, the later rector of Bruton Parish who would collaborate with John D. Rockefeller Jr. to create Colonial Williamsburg.

Following Jefferson Davis's death in December 1889, Minnigerode delivered a memorial address at St. Paul's, later published as Jefferson Davis: A Memorial Address Delivered in St. Paul's Church, Richmond, Virginia, December 11, 1889. That same year, Minnigerode retired from St. Paul's after thirty-three years as rector.

== Later life and death ==
After retiring from St. Paul's, Minnigerode moved to Alexandria, Virginia, where he served as chaplain to the Virginia Theological Seminary in semi-retirement. Minnigerode died on October 13, 1894, in Alexandria, Virginia. He was buried in Hollywood Cemetery in Richmond, Virginia.

== Legacy ==
Minnigerode is remembered for two contributions to American history. First, by introducing the Christmas tree to Williamsburg in 1842, he helped popularize a custom now common in the United States. The story of Minnigerode's first Christmas in Williamsburg is documented by family accounts passed down through Tucker's descendants, including a 1945 letter by Mary Haldane Tucker (wife of George Preston Coleman, grandson of Judge Tucker) and a 1948 monograph by Janet Coleman Kimbrough, Tucker's great-granddaughter. Beverley Randolph Tucker, another descendant, included an account in his 1942 book Tales of the Tuckers. Colonial Williamsburg continues to commemorate his introduction of the tradition each holiday season at the St. George Tucker House.

Second, as rector of St. Paul's for more than three decades—spanning the lead-up to the Civil War, the war itself, and the Reconstruction era—Minnigerode occupied a singular position at the center of Confederate religious and political life. A 2015 article in The Virginia Magazine of History and Biography examined his photographic portrait history and described him as "the Virginia capital's most notable nineteenth-century preacher."

In Addio, piccola mia, a 1979 East German film about playwright and revolutionary Georg Büchner, a young Minnigerode is played by German actor Lars Jung.

== Personal life ==
In May 1843, less than a year after his arrival in Williamsburg, Minnigerode married Mary Carter, daughter of Commander William Carter of North Carolina, at Bruton Parish Church. They had nine children. Their oldest son entered the Confederate army and served on the staff of General Fitzhugh Lee. Minnigerode had several notable grandchildren: Lucy Minnegerode, nurse and founder United States Public Health Service Nursing Corps; Marietta Minnegerode Andrews, painter and Monticello preservationist; and Meade Minnigerode, novelist and co-writer of the lyrics of Yale University's "Whiffenpoof Song."
