= Lucy Minnigerode =

American nurse (1871–1935)

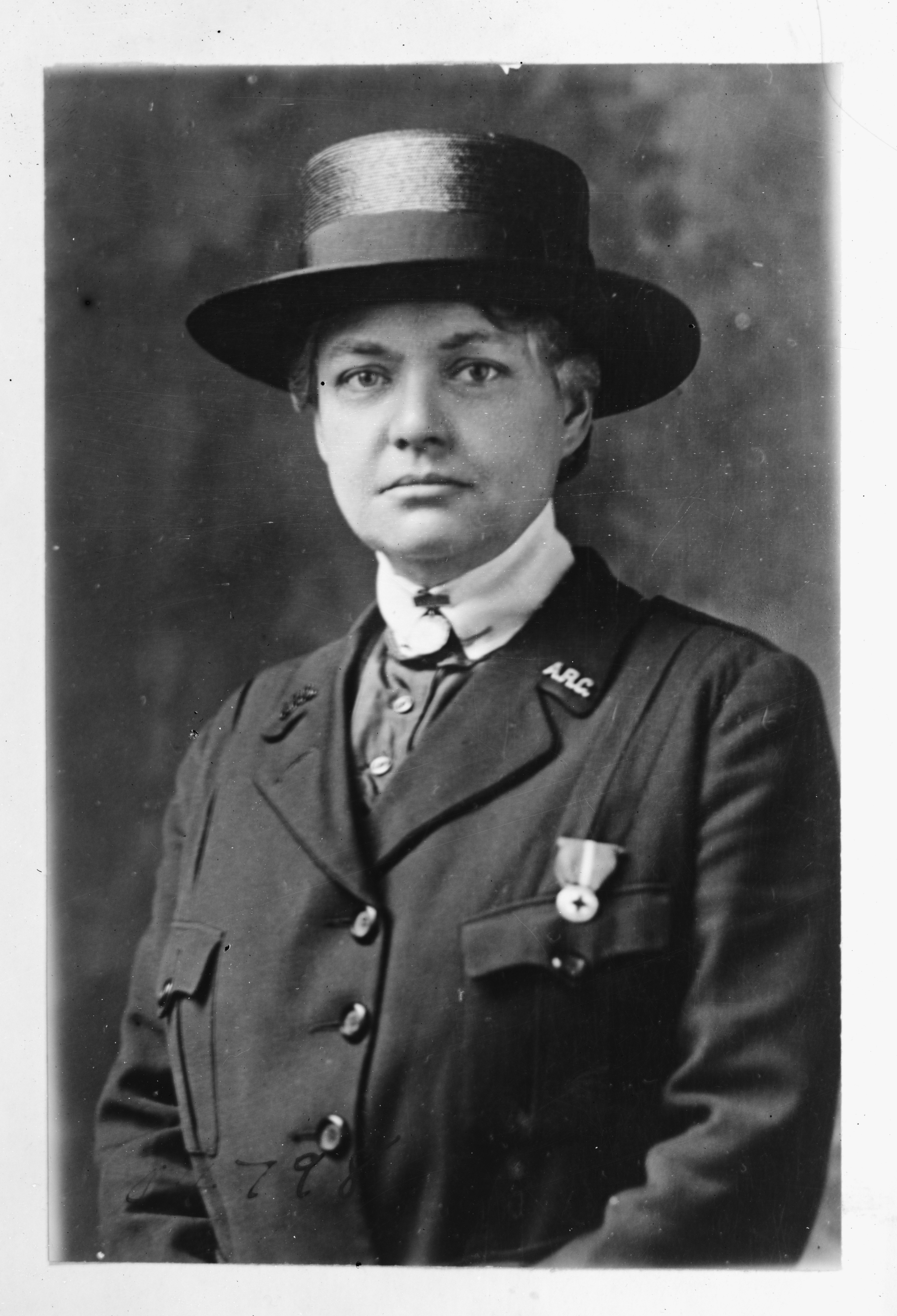
- Lucy Minnigerode in uniform, from a 1919 publication.
- Born: February 8, 1871; Middleburg, Virginia
- Died: March 24, 1935 (aged 64); Alexandria, Virginia
- Citizenship: American
- Education: Bellevue Hospital
- Occupation: nurse
- Known for: American nurse in World War I; first superintendent of the United States Public Health Service Nursing Corps

Lucy Minnigerode (February 8, 1871 – March 24, 1935) was an American nurse in World War I, and founder of the United States Public Health Service Nursing Corps. She was the eighth American recipient of the Florence Nightingale Medal, awarded by the International Committee of the Red Cross in 1925.

== Early life ==
Lucy Minnigerode was born in Middleburg, Virginia, the daughter of Charles Minnigerode and Virginia Cuthbert Powell Minnigerode. Her father served in the Confederate States Army in the American Civil War. Her sister was artist Marietta Minnigerode Andrews, who was married to another artist, Eliphalet Frazer Andrews. Her grandfather, Charles Frederick Ernest Minnigerode, was a German classics professor and clergyman, known as the "Father Confessor of the Confederacy" because he was the pastor of a prominent Episcopal church in Richmond, Virginia.

Lucy Minnigerode attended Arlington Institute, a girls' school in Alexandria, Virginia. She trained as a nurse at Bellevue Hospital in New York, completing her studies in 1905.

== Career ==
Minnigerode was superintendent of nurses at the Episcopal Eye, Ear and Throat Hospital in Washington, D.C. from 1910 to 1914. She joined an American Red Cross "mercy ship" to work at a hospital in Kiev in 1914, serving as supervising nurse for Unit C, under senior supervisor Helen Scott Hay. From 1915 to 1917, she directed the Columbia Hospital for Women in Washington D.C.; then she joined the staff of Clara Noyes at American Red Cross headquarters in that city. In 1919 she was chosen by Noyes to inspect and report on U. S. Public Health Service hospitals, and was appointed superintendent of the new department of nurses under the Public Health Service. One of her first tasks was to recruit nurses to work in veterans' hospitals after 1921. She is remembered as the founder of the U. S. Public Health Service Nursing Corps. She also chaired the Nurses in Government section of the American Nurses Association. She was considered part of the informal "Women's Cabinet" in Washington in 1925, along with Grace Abbott, Kathryn Sellers, and Mabel Walker Willebrandt.

In 1925, she became the eighth American nurse to receive the Florence Nightingale Medal from the International Red Cross in Geneva. She also received the Order of Saint Anna in Russia.

== Death and legacy ==
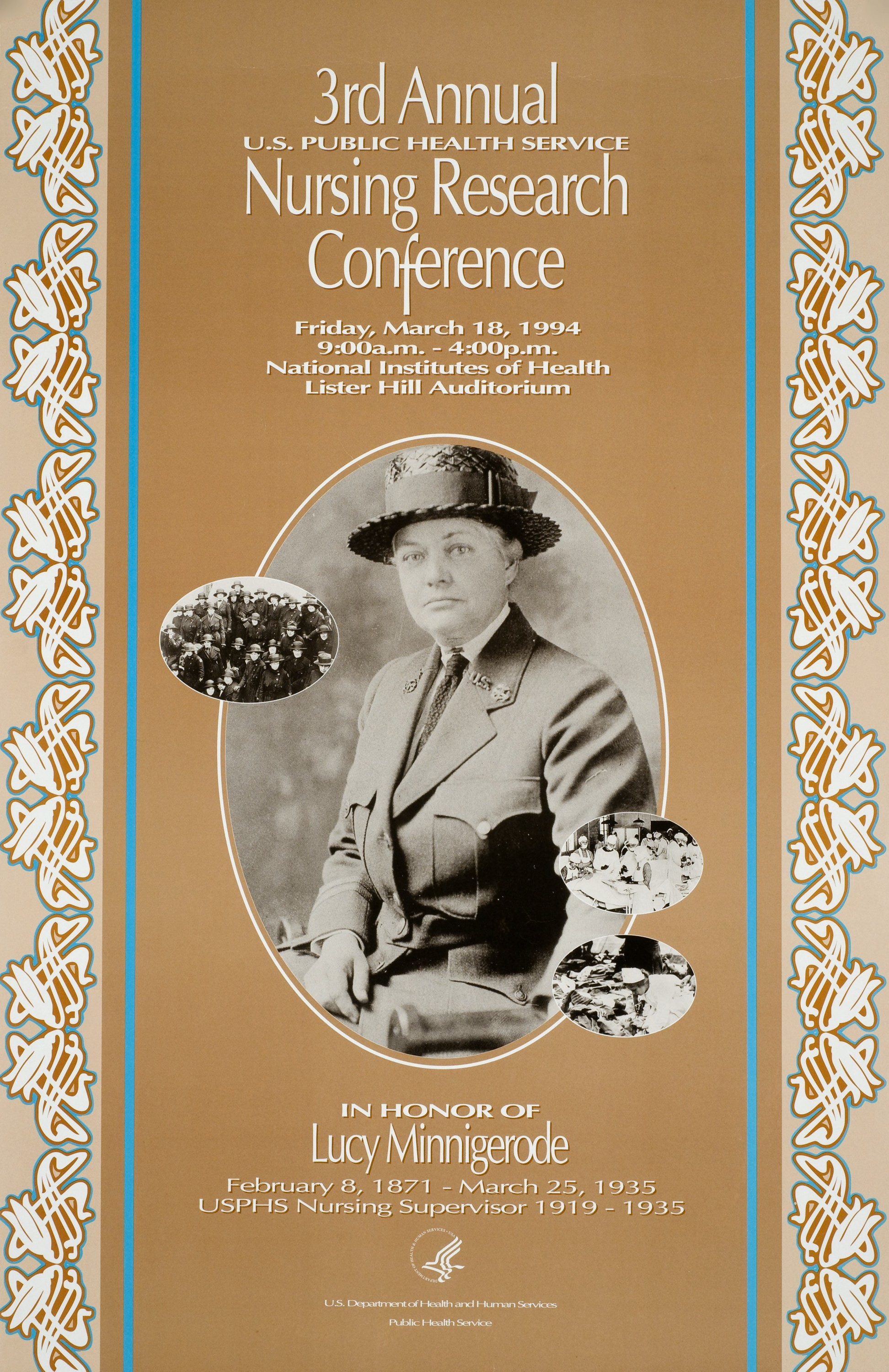
U.S. Public Health Service Nursing Research Conference in 1994 featured Minnigerode

Minnigerode died at her niece's home in Alexandria, Virginia, in 1935, aged 64 years. The American Nurses Association established a Lucy Minnigerode Memorial Fund soon after her death. The five Minnigerode Awards for Nursing Excellence (MANE), given by the U. S. Public Health Service, are named for her.

In 1994, the U. S. Public Health Service Nursing Research Conference honored Lucy Minnigerode, and her image was used for the event's poster.
