= Luise Büchner =

German women's rights activist and writer

Elisabeth Emma Louise Büchner
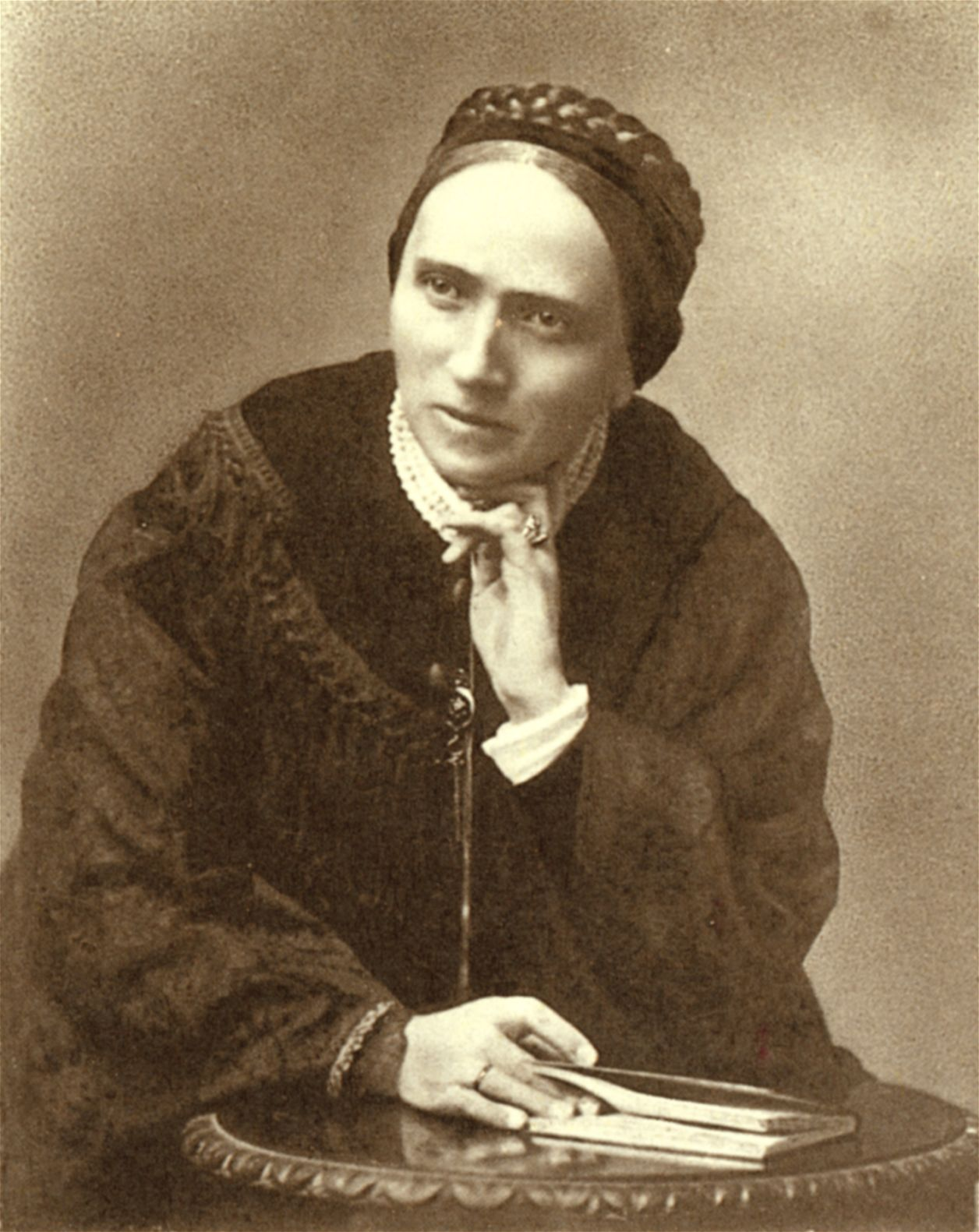
- Büchner c. 1870
- Born: 12 June 1821; Darmstadt, Germany
- Died: 28 November 1877 (aged 56)
- Occupations: Women's rights activist and writer
- Known for: Die Frauen und ihr Beruf

Elisabeth Emma Louise "Luise" Büchner (12 June 1821, Darmstadt – 28 November 1877) was a German women's rights activist and writer of essays, novels, travelogues and poetry.

She published Die Frauen und ihr Beruf (Woman and Their Vocation) anonymously in 1855, in which she campaigned for equality of education for girls, with the opportunity for productive vocations as adult women, but also to better prepare young women for motherhood. Büchner rejected the unproductive pastimes increasingly seen as acceptable for middle-class women whose leisure time was increasing due to advances in machinery. During this period, economic factors led to fewer marriages and so an increase in single women. Die Frauen was reviewed extensively in German newspapers and journals, and was sold even in England, France and Russia. Three more editions were published through 1872.

Büchner became the director of the Alice Association for Women's Education and Employment, which had been founded by Grand Duchess Alice of Hesse, and sponsored training in nursing and trades. Through this organisation Büchner was important in the development of nursing as a paid vocation without denominational attachments, rather than a voluntary activity associated with religious orders.

Among her siblings, five of whom survived infancy, were Georg, Ludwig, Wilhelm, and Alexander. During World War II, in September 1944, the house in which the Büchner family had long lived was bombed. With it, family records were lost, and among the deaths was her nephew Georg, the living family member who had been closest to Luise. These losses have limited scholarship on Büchner.
