= John Millington (professor) =

English engineer

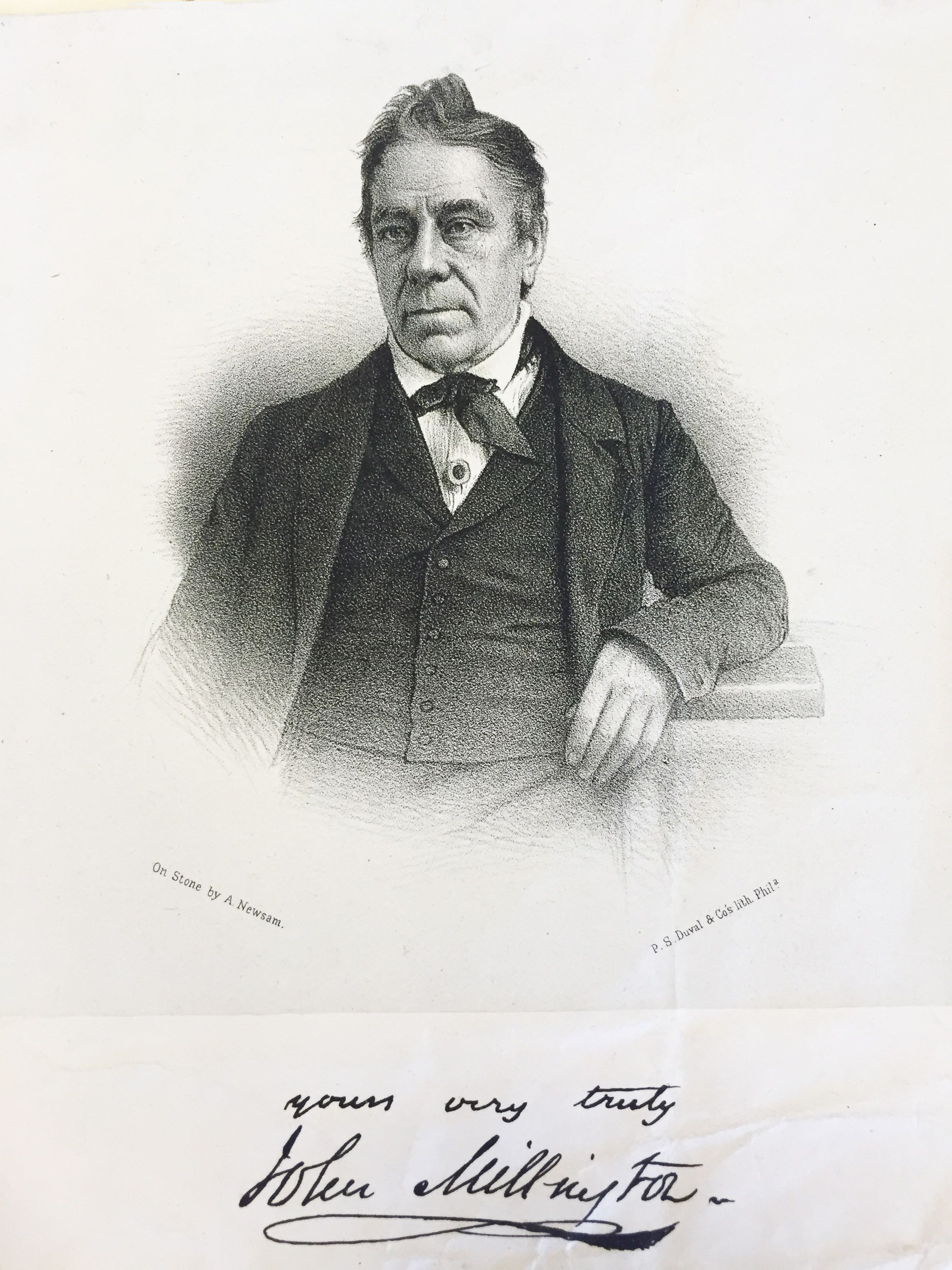
- Born: 11 May 1779; Hammersmith, London, United Kingdom
- Died: 10 July 1868 (aged 89); Richmond, Virginia, United States

Academic background
- Education: University of Oxford

Academic work
- Discipline: Civil Engineering, Natural Philosophy, Chemistry
- Institutions: London University; College of William & Mary; University of Mississippi; Memphis Medical College

John Millington (11 May 1779 – 10 July 1868) was an English civil engineer, lawyer, scientist, and academic who spent the latter half of his career in the United States. Selected for the inaugural Chair of Civil Engineering at London University in 1827, he became the first person formally appointed to teach civil engineering at the university-level in England—and possibly in the English-speaking world. Millington is also remembered for providing the opening lecture of the London Mechanics' Institution (now Birkbeck, University of London), delivering the first series of Royal Institution Christmas Lectures, serving for more than a decade as Chair of Chemistry, Natural Philosophy, and Engineering at the College of William & Mary, and being part of the original faculty of the University of Mississippi.

== Early life and education ==
Millington was born on 11 May 1779 in Hammersmith, London. He was baptized at St. George's Anglican Church. On 24 March 1796, he was confirmed in the Chapel Royal of St. James's Palace.

He attended Oxford University but withdrew due to financial difficulties. In 1802 he married Emily Hamilton at the parish church of St James. The couple had six children.

That same year he was admitted to the bar, and for several years practiced as an attorney, with particular expertise in patent law. There is also evidence that he studied medicine with Astley Cooper at Guy's Hospital. Millington subsequently turned to engineering, working for a period with road-builder John Loudon McAdam. In 1805, Millington was proposed as a Fellow of the Society of Arts, and served after his election as Steward of the Society.

== Career in England ==
=== Engineering practice ===
In June 1810, Millington was appointed engineer to the West Middlesex Waterworks, but was dismissed in January 1811 and described in company records as having been "grossly and generally negligent." He also drew up the specification for construction of the Marlow Suspension Bridge, but his supervision of the work in 1829 was judged incompetent, and the project was taken over by William Tierney Clark. He additionally owned a foundry in Webbs Lane, Hammersmith.

=== Royal Institution ===
In 1815, Millington was appointed a lecturer at the Royal Institution in London. On 7 July 1817, he was formally appointed Professor of Mechanics there, a position he held until 1829. In that role he gave annual courses of lectures on natural philosophy, mechanics, and astronomy, and was also on the teaching staff of Guy's Hospital. In 1825, Millington delivered the inaugural series of what became the Royal Institution Christmas Lectures, presenting a 22-lecture course on natural philosophy aimed at a juvenile audience, with 15 lectures held over the Christmas holiday and the remainder at Easter. The following year the series was presented by John Wallis, and in 1827 by Michael Faraday, who went on to become the most celebrated lecturer in the series' history.

=== London University and learned societies ===
In 1827, Millington was announced as the inaugural Professor of Engineering and the Application of Mechanical Philosophy to the Arts at the newly founded London University (now University College London), though he left the position within a year due to financial issues. Millington was one of the original fellows of the Astronomical Society of London (later the Royal Astronomical Society) and served as its secretary from 14 February 1823 to 10 February 1826. He also served as vice-president of Dr. George Birkbeck's London Mechanics' Institute, which he helped to found in 1823.

== Career in Mexico and the United States ==
=== Mexican Mines ===
In 1829 or 1830, Millington left the Royal Institution and departed England with his family. He was engaged by the Anglo-Mexican Mining Association of Vera Cruz as chief engineer of their silver mines and superintendent of the mint, based at Guanajuato. He remained in Mexico until approximately 1832, when he traveled to Philadelphia. In 1833, while on her way to join him in Philadelphia, his wife Emily died.

=== Philadelphia and Virginia ===
From 1832, Millington resided in Philadelphia, where he opened a scientific equipment store and worked as an engineering consultant.

In 1834–1835, the Geological Society of Pennsylvania employed him to investigate the Rappahannock goldmines in Virginia, and he published a paper, "On the Rappahannock Gold Mines in Virginia," in the society's Transactions. In 1835, he served as chief engineer to the Rappahannock Mining Company.

=== College of William & Mary ===
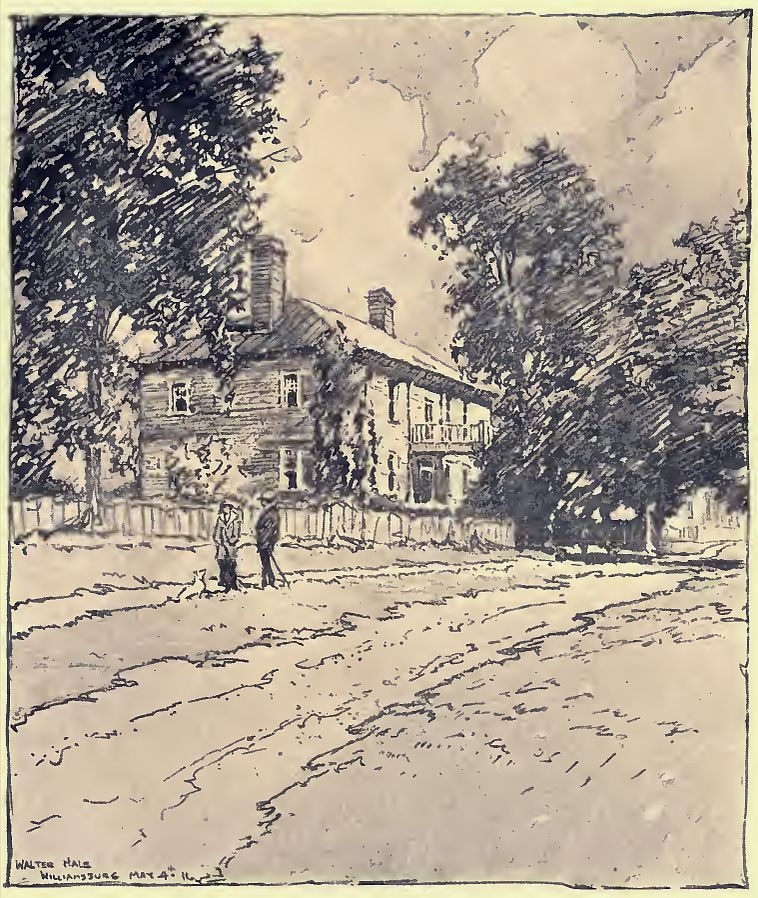
The Wythe House, Millington's home in Williamsburg

In 1836, Millington was offered the Chair of Chemistry and Natural Philosophy at the College of William & Mary in Williamsburg, Virginia. Millington shared the news with his old friend Michael Faraday, who responded enthusiastically: "And I know so much of your love for science as to be sure that in your new appointment you will find a continual source of the highest enjoyment."

During his time at the college, he resided in the historic Wythe House. In 1838, he received a doctorate of medicine from Jefferson Medical College in Philadelphia. His 1839 textbook Elements of Civil Engineering, published in Philadelphia, was a substantial 725-page work that represents one of the earliest systematic treatments of civil engineering published in the United States. Millington is credited with largely constructing William & Mary's scientific apparatus during the period of his tenure there.

Though by all accounts Millington flourished at William & Mary and was appreciated by the college and town of Williamsburg, he, as well as other notable faculty like Charles Minnigerode and George Frederick Holmes, resigned during the "troubles" of 1848. He wrote to his friend Joseph Henry, the first Secretary of the Smithsonian Institution:

"I have no wish or inclination to leave the state, yet an advertisement has appeared requiring an entire faculty in a new University about to open for the first time at Oxford in Mississippi in November next--some of our [William & Mary] professors have offered themselves for election and have induced me to do the same thing from a wish that four of our faculty (myself included) will be candidates for chairs in this new concern."

=== University of Mississippi and Memphis Medical College ===
Millington beat at least 30 other candidates to be appointed Chair of Natural Science at the newly founded University of Mississippi. He had made it clear that he would bring his scientific apparatus from William & Mary to the university. Millington's successor at Ole Miss, Frederick A. P. Barnard, later speculated that Millington was chosen for the position in large part because of this equipment: "He was advanced in life when elected and was preferred to his competitors chiefly, I think, because of his possession of an excellent collection of apparatus which he proposed to put at the service of the University." The University of Mississippi purchased Millington's equipment in 1851, and as of 2026, is still in possession of some of his scientific instruments, which are displayed at the University of Mississippi Museum.

In 1853, Millington resigned his chair to accept an appointment as Professor of Chemistry and Toxicology at the Medical College in Memphis, Tennessee. He left that position in 1859 or 1860, though his attempt to retire in La Grange, Tennessee was thwarted by the American Civil War. Now in his 80s, he sought refuge in Philadelphia.

== Later life and death ==
After the Civil War, Millington and his second wife moved to Richmond, Virginia, to live with their daughter Kate Blankenship. He died in Richmond on 10 July 1868 at the age of 89.

== Legacy ==
George Frederick Holmes, first President of the University of Mississippi, once recalled that Millington "was thoroughly loveable and was beloved by all ages. He scarcely made an enemy, and rarely failed to make a friend. But he was so round a man that he afforded no prominences to be readily grasped by the hand."

Millington's career spanned several firsts in the history of science and engineering education on both sides of the Atlantic. His was the first faculty appointment in civil engineering in England, and although he resigned after a short period, this role marked the beginning of formal civil engineering education in British universities. His inaugural series Royal Institution Christmas Lectures helped launch a series that later became associated with scientists including Michael Faraday and William Bragg.

At William & Mary, Millington Hall—a science building constructed in 1966–1968 and formally named the John Millington Hall of Life Sciences—was named in his honor, housing the Biology and Psychology departments until its demolition in 2017 to make way for the fourth Integrated Science Center. His son Thomas Millington produced well-known drawings of the Brafferton, the Wren Building, and the President's House at William & Mary in the 1840s–1850s, known collectively as the Millington prints. Millington's papers from this period are preserved at the Special Collections Research Center, Swem Library, College of William & Mary. They include diaries, correspondence, and records of a financial dispute—a claim against William & Mary dating from 1848 to 1853.
