= The Hessian Courier =

1834 pamphlet by Georg Büchner

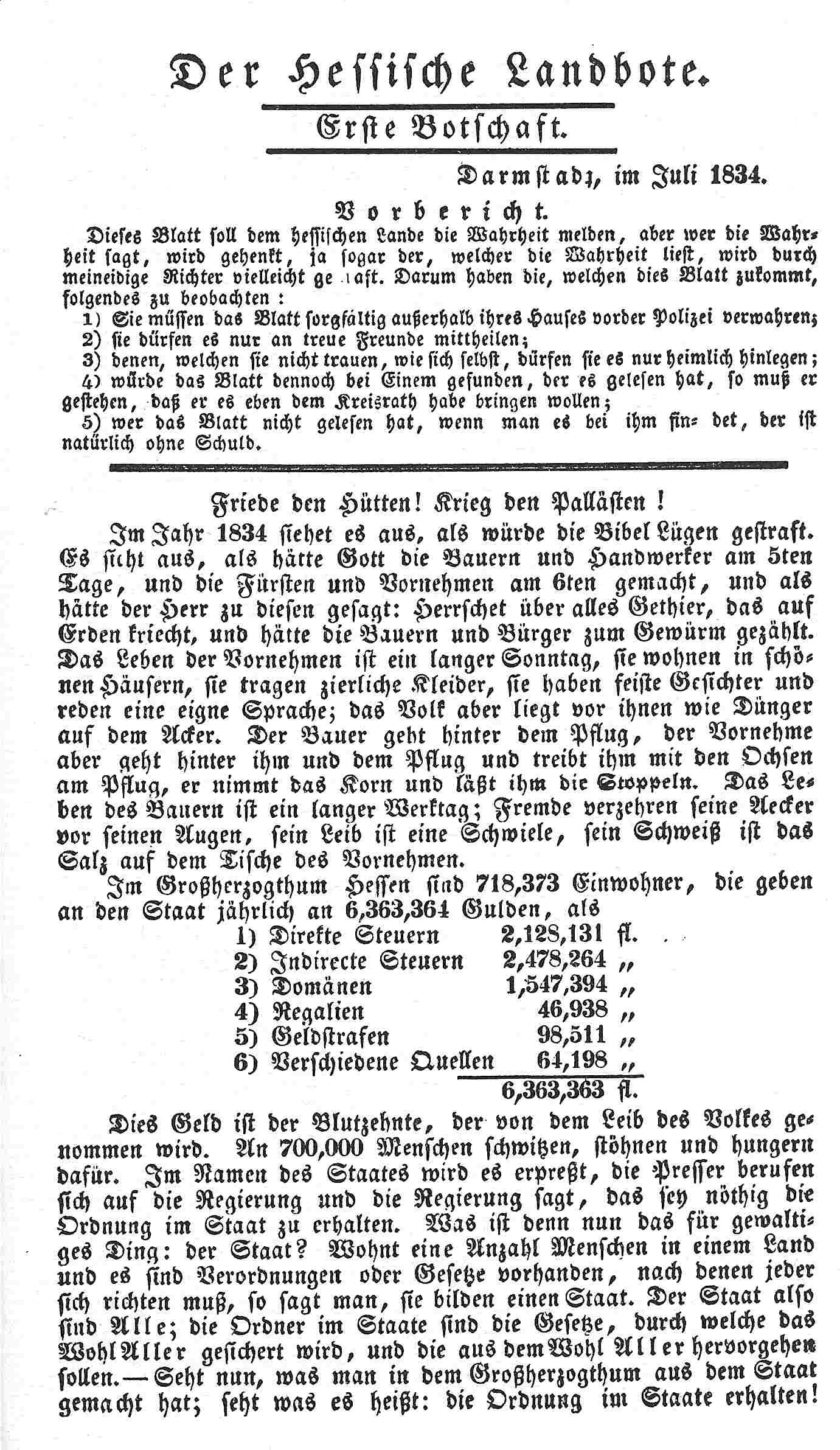
First page of Der hessische Landbote by Georg Büchner, July 1834.

The Hessian Courier (German: Der hessische Landbote) is an eight-page pamphlet, written by Georg Büchner in 1834, in which he argues against the social injustices of his time. It was printed and published following editorial revision by the Butzbach pastor Friedrich Ludwig Weidig. The first copies of the pamphlet were secretly distributed in the Grand Duchy of Hesse on the eve of 31 July 1834. The pamphlet is famous for its first line: "Peace to the huts! War on the palaces!" (Friede den Hütten! Krieg den Palästen!).

== Contents of the pamphlet ==
The pamphlet begins after a short preface (with instructions to the readers on how best they should handle the illegal text) with the rallying call: "Peace to the huts! War on the palaces!", a translation of a motto of the French revolution. The circulation of the pamphlet is unknown, it was probably in the range of 1,200 to 1,500 copies. The authors compare the social conditions in Hesse at that time with a (modified) example from the creation story in the Bible. They ask provocatively if, unlike in Genesis, the "peasants and craftsmen" were created on the fifth rather than the sixth day and are therefore to be categorised as animals that can be controlled at the whim of the people created on the sixth day, namely "the princes and the nobles." In addition, the authors denounce the judiciary as a "whore of the princes"; it is "just a way to keep you in order so that they can more easily enslave you." The key motif of this polemic pamphlet, which runs through the entire text as a continuous theme, is the connection of this biblical style with the listing of figures showing the (high) tax revenues and (wasteful) expenditure of the Grand Duchy of Hessen. Thus Büchner and Weidig tried to convince the God-fearing people of the urgency of a revolution and the justification of an uprising against the Grand Duke and the state order, which at the time was seen to be "given by God's grace" and therefore untouchable.

== Origins and distribution ==
It is assumed that the first draft of Georg Büchner's pamphlet was written in late March 1834 at the Badenburg in Gießen and was revised in May by Friedrich Ludwig Weidig. Between 5 and 9 July, Georg Büchner and an associate brought the revised text to the printers at Offenbach am Main. On 31 July, Karl Minnigerode, Friedrich Jacob Schütz and Karl Zeuner collected the printed copies of the text from the Carl Preller printing presses to distribute them. An informant named Johann Konrad Kuhl told the police about the highly charged text. The very next day, 1 August, Karl Minnigerode was arrested with 139 copies of the pamphlet in his possession. Büchner warned Schütz, Zeuner and Weidig about the police activities. The copies that had not been confiscated were then distributed.

The pamphlet was revised once again by Leopold Eichelberg and reprinted in Marburg in November. In some cases, entire passages were removed or added during these revisions. For example, if one compares the versions of July and November 1834, the introductory text (mentioned above) is missing from the November edition, and the pamphlet begins directly with the rallying cry "Peace to the huts..." Büchner's original text does not survive. The July edition revised by Weidig is now the starting point for research. According to reports, Büchner was incensed by the changes made by Weidig and was no longer prepared to accept the text as his own. This suggests that the changes were relatively significant. Büchner research suggests that Weidig's interventions are more frequent in the second part in particular.

== Aftermath ==
The authorities reacted violently to the release of the pamphlet. A wanted poster was released for Büchner's arrest, but he was able to flee across the French border to Strasbourg in 1835. Weidig, who was now a pastor in Ober-Gleen after being forced to relocate, was arrested later along with other opposition figures. He was first detained in Friedberg and then in Darmstadt. There he was subjected to inhumane conditions; he was tortured and died in 1837 in circumstances that were never fully explained. The official investigation determined the cause of death to be suicide by the slitting of his wrists.

A forensic report produced in 1975 by the University of Heidelberg, which naturally could only be a reassessment of the written evidence, confirmed this and indicated that the death was caused by lack of medical intervention. The mysterious death of “Pastor Weidig” became a political weapon in the 1840s. In the process, rumours of external influence up to allegations of murder were circulated, none of which can be either completely proven or disproven, since no impartial sources are now available.

== Assessment ==
The Hessian Courier is to be seen as a call for revolution to the rural population, against both the aristocratic upper-class and (at least in Büchner's original) against the rich liberal middle classes, although Weidig is supposed to have replaced Büchner's term “die Reichen” (the rich) with “die Vornehmen” (gentry, nobility), to lessen criticism. Historically preceding this was the Hambacher Fest, during which oppositional forces from all social classes met, but joint action against the ruling class could not be agreed upon. This became apparent in the ‘Frankfurter Wachensturm’ of 3 April 1833, which was poorly organised and therefore quickly quashed. One of the main reasons unity on a broad front could not be reached was because the liberal middle class were repeatedly palmed off with minor concessions and promises by the nobility. This was useless for the poor and starving rural population of Hesse. They occasionally made their presence felt through protests, but these were brutally suppressed, as in the ‘Södel’ bloodbath in 1830.

Therefore, the Courier calls on the peasantry to start a revolution against both the ruling class and the propertied classes. According to Büchner "only the necessary desire of the masses can bring about change." In later writings Büchner expresses himself even more clearly, perhaps more resignedly: for example in a letter to Karl Gutzkow he expresses his belief that the people cannot be moved to revolt through idealism: "and the masses themselves? There are only two levers for them: material need and religious fanaticism." Even if their use of religion is not fanatical, Büchner and Weidig make use of these two levers in the Hessian Courier, in order to win 'the masses' over to their aims. The authors place the material misery of the peasantry before their eyes, in particular contrast to 'the gentry,' and at the same time provide religious justification for the desired uprising.

The Hessian Courier is considered one of the most important works of the 'Vormärz' period. Thomas Nipperdey called it the first great manifesto for a social revolution. August Bebel and Vladimir Lenin later used its rallying cry.
