= Ludwig Büchner =

German philosopher and scientist (1824–1899)

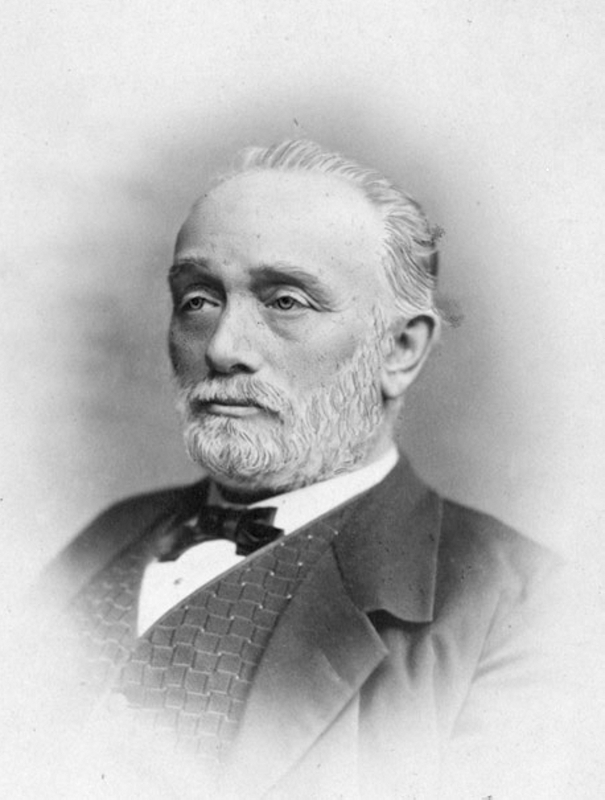
- Born: Friedrich Karl Christian Ludwig Büchner; 29 March 1824; Darmstadt, Grand Duchy of Hesse, German Confederation
- Died: 30 April 1899 (aged 75); Darmstadt, Grand Duchy of Hesse, German Empire
- Political party: German Free-minded Party
- Relatives: Georg Büchner (brother); Luise Büchner (sister)

Education
- Education: University of Giessen; University of Strasbourg; University of Würzburg; University of Vienna
- Thesis: Beiträge zur Hall'schen Lehre von einem excitomotorischen Nervensystem (Contributions to the Hallian Theory of an Excito-motor Nervous System) (1848)

Philosophical work
- Era: 19th-century philosophy
- Region: Western philosophy
- School: German materialism
- Institutions: University of Tübingen
- Main interests: Philosophy of science
- Notable ideas: Nature is purely physical

Friedrich Karl Christian Ludwig Büchner (/ˈbjuːknər/; German: [ˈbyːçnɐ]; 29 March 1824 – 30 April 1899) was a German philosopher, physiologist and physician who became one of the exponents of 19th-century scientific materialism.

== Biography ==
Büchner was born at Darmstadt on 29 March 1824. From 1842 to 1848 he studied physics, chemistry, botany, mineralogy, philosophy and medicine at the University of Giessen, where he graduated in 1848 with a dissertation entitled Beiträge zur Hall'schen Lehre von einem excitomotorischen Nervensystem (Contributions to the Hallian Theory of an Excito-motor Nervous System). Afterwards, he continued his studies at the University of Strasbourg, the University of Würzburg (where he studied pathology with the great Rudolf Virchow) and the University of Vienna. In 1852 he became lecturer in medicine at the University of Tübingen, where he published his magnum opus Kraft und Stoff: Empirisch-naturphilosophische Studien (Force and Matter: Empiricophilosophical Studies, 1855). Büchner was one of the founding members of the Freies Deutsches Hochstift (Free German Foundation).

According to Friedrich Albert Lange (Geschichte des Materialismus, 1866), Kraft und Stoff was imbued with a fanatical enthusiasm for humanity. Büchner sought to demonstrate the indestructibility of matter, and the finality of physical force. The scientific materialism of this work, which contemporaries often lumped together with the publications of other 'materialists' like Karl Vogt and Jacob Moleschott, caused so much opposition that he was compelled to give up his post at Tübingen, and he retired to Darmstadt. He practiced as a physician and contributed regularly to pathological, physiological and popular magazines.

He continued his philosophical work in defense of materialism, and published Natur und Geist (Nature and Spirit, 1857), Aus Natur und Wissenschaft (From Nature and Science, vol. I., 1862; vol. II., 1884), Der Fortschritt in Natur und Geschichte im Lichte der Darwinschen Theorie (Progress in Nature and History in the Light of the Darwinian Theory, 1884), Tatsachen und Theorien aus dem naturwissenschaftlichen Leben der Gegenwart (Facts and Theories in the Scientific Life of Present, 1887), Fremdes und Eigenes aus dem geistligen Leben der Gegenwart (Strangers and Selves in the Spiritual Life of the Present, 1890), Darwinismus und Socialismus (Darwinism and Socialism, 1894), Im Dienste der Wahrheit (In the Service of Truth, 1899).

Ludwig Büchner's materialism was the founding ground for the freethinkers' movement in Germany. In 1881 he founded in Frankfurt the "German Freethinkers League" ("Deutsche Freidenkerbund"). Being politically active, Büchner was a member of the second chamber of the Landstände of the Grand Duchy of Hesse as a representative of the German Free-minded Party from 1884 to 1890.

He died at Darmstadt on 30 April 1899.

== Philosophical work ==
In estimating Büchner's philosophy it must be remembered that he was primarily a physiologist, not a metaphysician. Matter and force (or energy) are, he maintained, infinite; the conservation of force follows from the imperishability of matter, the ultimate basis of all science.

Büchner is not always clear in his theory of the relation between matter and force. At one time he refuses to explain it, but generally he assumes that all natural and spiritual forces are indwelling in matter. Just as a steam engine, he says in Kraft und Stoff (7th ed., p. 130), produces motion, so the intricate organic complex of force-bearing substance in an animal organism produces a total sum of certain effects, which, when bound together in a unity, are called by us mind, soul, thought. Here he postulates force and mind as emanating from original matter, a materialistic monism. But in other parts of his works he suggests that mind and matter are two different aspects of that which is the basis of all things, a monism which is not necessarily materialistic.

Büchner was much less concerned to establish a scientific metaphysics than to protest against the romantic idealism of his predecessors and the theological interpretations of the universe. Nature according to him is purely physical; it has no purpose, no will, no laws imposed by extraneous authority, no supernatural ethical sanction.

Büchner endorsed Charles Darwin's theory of evolution within a decade of its first issuance, writing the book Man in the Past, Present and Future in 1869 about what he felt were Darwinism's implications. He believed that this included humanity moving into a kinder state of being, where a primitive struggle for life would no longer apply or at least be replaced with purely intellectual struggles, and war would end. To achieve this, Büchner advocated government social programs which would aid greater equality, including the collective ownership of land and women's rights (however he did not extend this to them receiving suffrage, deeming that premature at the time).

Büchner, together with Edward Aveling, had attended the congress of the "International Federation of Freethinkers" held in London from 25 to 27 September 1881, the following day they visited Darwin on 28 September. Aveling published a full account of his visit in the National Reformer in 1882.

== Family ==
Ludwig Büchner was born in the family of Ernst Karl Büchner, a senior medical councilor and court doctor in the Grand Duchy of Hesse. Ludwig was the younger brother of Georg Büchner, a famous revolutionary playwright, and Luise Büchner, a women's rights advocate; and the uncle of Ernst Büchner, inventor of the Büchner flask.
