= Daisy Blanche King =

American painter

- Born: 1875; Washington, D.C.
- Died: 1947 (aged 71–72)
- Known for: Painting, Sculpture

Daisy Blanche King (1875–1947) was an American painter and sculptor.

== Biography ==
King was born in Washington, D.C., and had most of her schooling in that city at the Corcoran School of Art, from which she received a medal; her instructors included Eliphalet Frazer Andrews, Ulric Stonewall Jackson Dunbar, and Henry J. Ellicott. She also studied at the School of the Museum of Fine Arts, Boston with Bela Pratt. From this stage of her career she left an account of an attempted visit she paid with her father in 1893 to Winslow Homer at his studio in Prout's Neck, Maine.

King remained active in the city of her birth until around 1900, exhibiting her work with the Society of Washington Artists and the Washington Water Color Club. She had moved to New York by 1910, remaining there at least until 1940. In the former year she showed at the National Academy of Design; she appeared in exhibits with the Society of Independent Artists in 1922 and 1932. St. Paul's Episcopal Church in Stockbridge, Massachusetts, contains a bronze tablet from Tiffany & Co. to King's design, memorializing Arthur Lawrence, a former rector, which was unveiled in 1912. An 1891 drawing titled Come Along, in pen and ink over graphite on wove paper, was formerly owned by the Corcoran Gallery of Art; at that institution's dissolution, it was acquired by the National Gallery of Art. King also produced a mural for the Gurley Memorial Church in Washington, D.C., and was active as a portraitist.

King died in 1947.
