= Kathryn Sellers =

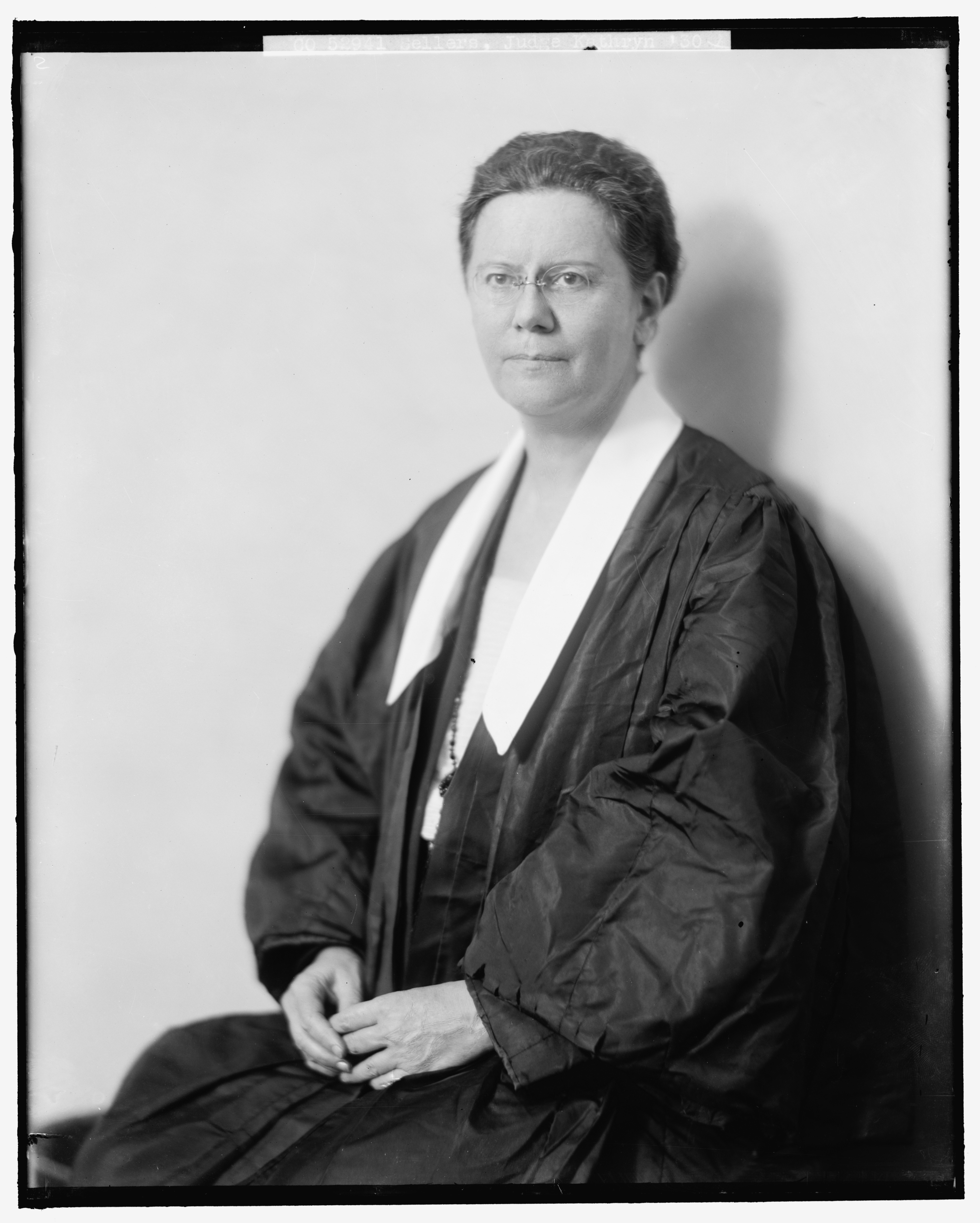

Head Judge of the Juvenile Court for the District of Columbia
- In office 1918–1934
- Appointed by: Woodrow Wilson

Personal details
- Born: Kathryn Sellers; December 25, 1870 Broadway, Ohio, U.S.
- Died: February 23, 1939 (aged 68) Washington, D.C., U.S.

Kathryn Sellers (December 25, 1870 – February 23, 1939) was the first woman to be appointed a federal judge in the United States. She was nominated to the head of the Juvenile Court of the District of Columbia by President Woodrow Wilson in 1918.

== Biography ==
Sellers was born on December 25, 1870, in Broadway, Ohio. She worked as a bibliographer and librarian, and was employed by the weather bureau in Washington, D.C., and by the U.S. Department of State from 1900 to 1911. During this time Sellers became a member of the Women's Bar Association of the District of Columbia.

In 1918, President Woodrow Wilson nominated Sellers to be head of the Juvenile Court of the District of Columbia. The Senate confirmed Sellers later that year, making her the first woman appointed to the federal judiciary. Sellers' expertise was in international law and had no special experience relating to juvenile issues. During her time on the federal bench, President Wilson remarked to a D.C. Supreme Court judge that "he was making an experiment of the woman judge—not only for the juvenile court, but for all courts." Significantly, the D.C. Supreme Court judge noted that he believed the future for women jurists was "unlimited . . . “especially where women and children come often." Sellers was regarded as a prominent symbol of women’s political and professional progress. She served on the federal bench until she resigned on February 17, 1934.

Sellers died on February 23, 1939, at her home in Washington, D.C.

== See also ==
- List of first women lawyers and judges in the United States

Legal offices
Preceded by	Head Judge of the Juvenile Court for the District of Columbia; 1918–1934	Succeeded by
