= Eliphalet Frazer Andrews =

American painter (1835–1915)

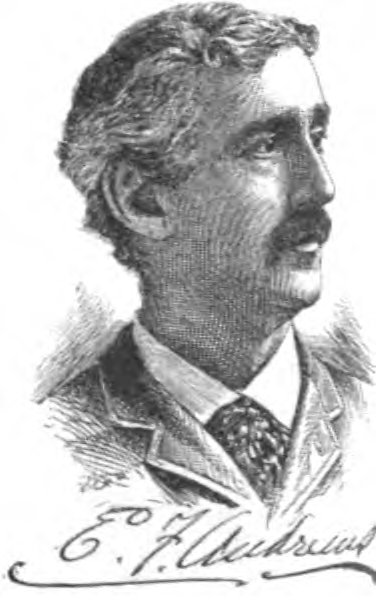
- Born: June 8, 1835; Steubenville, Ohio
- Died: March 15, 1915 (aged 79); Washington, D.C.
- Resting place: Union Cemetery
- Known for: painting
- Spouse: Marietta Fauntleroy Minnigerode

Eliphalet Frazer Andrews (June 11, 1835 – March 15, 1915) was an American painter. He established an art instruction curriculum at the behest of William Wilson Corcoran at his Corcoran School of Art, and served as its director from 1877 to 1902. Known primarily as a portraitist, he received many commissions to create both original portraits and copies of images of deceased famous Americans, which are displayed by federal, state, and local institutions. His art is housed at the Smithsonian American Art Museum and the Ohio State Capitol, and there are also numerous paintings at the White House and the United States Capitol.

== Early life ==
Born in Steubenville, Ohio, to Dr. Alexander Hull and Eliza Ann (Frazer) Andrews, he received early training at Marietta College in Ohio, and further study in the Royal Prussian Academy, Berlin, in the atelier of Ludwig Knaus, at the Düsseldorf Academy and with Leon Bonnat at the Ecole des Beaux-Arts, Paris.

== Career ==
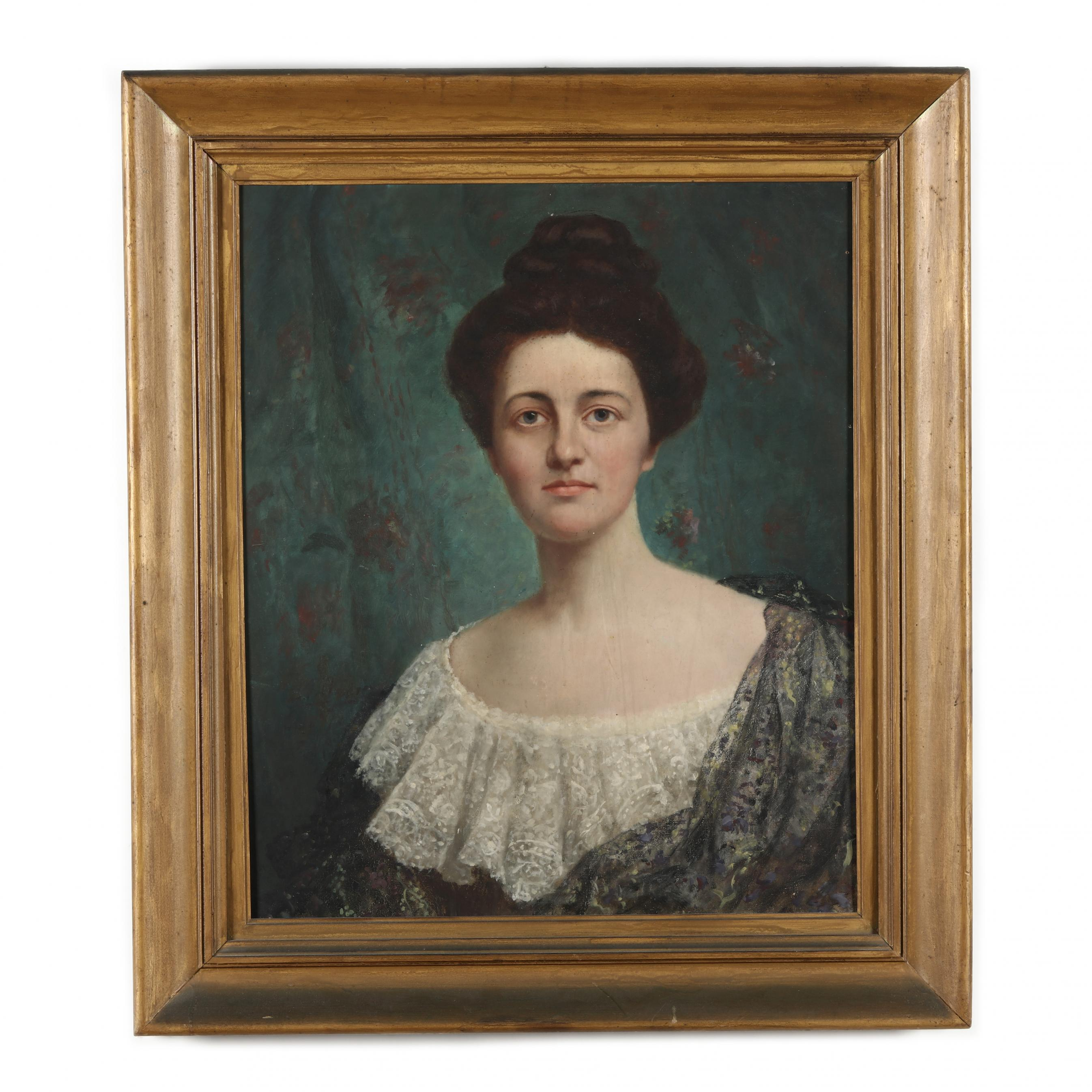
Andrews' portrait of Mary French Howard, 1908. Howard was the spouse of Clarance Randolph Howard. This original portrait is one of the only known surviving commissioned paintings by Andrews of a non-political or military official.

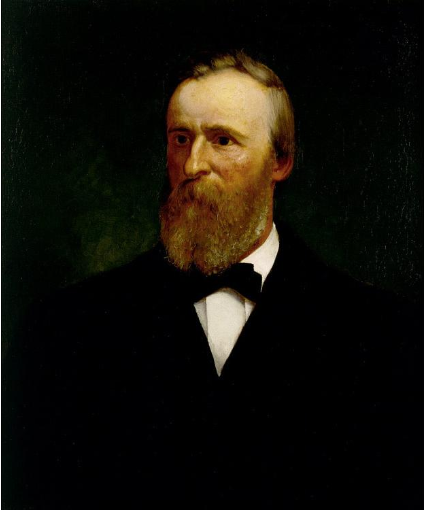
Rutherford B. Hayes portrait by Eliphalet Frazer Andrews, 1881

Following the election of his friend Rutherford B. Hayes as President Andrews moved to Washington, D.C.

William Wilson Corcoran hired Andrews to establish an art instruction curriculum at his Corcoran School of Art. Andrews served as its director from 1877 to 1902, and later as the Corcoran Art Gallery until his death. Pupils included Catharine Carter Critcher and Daisy Blanche King.

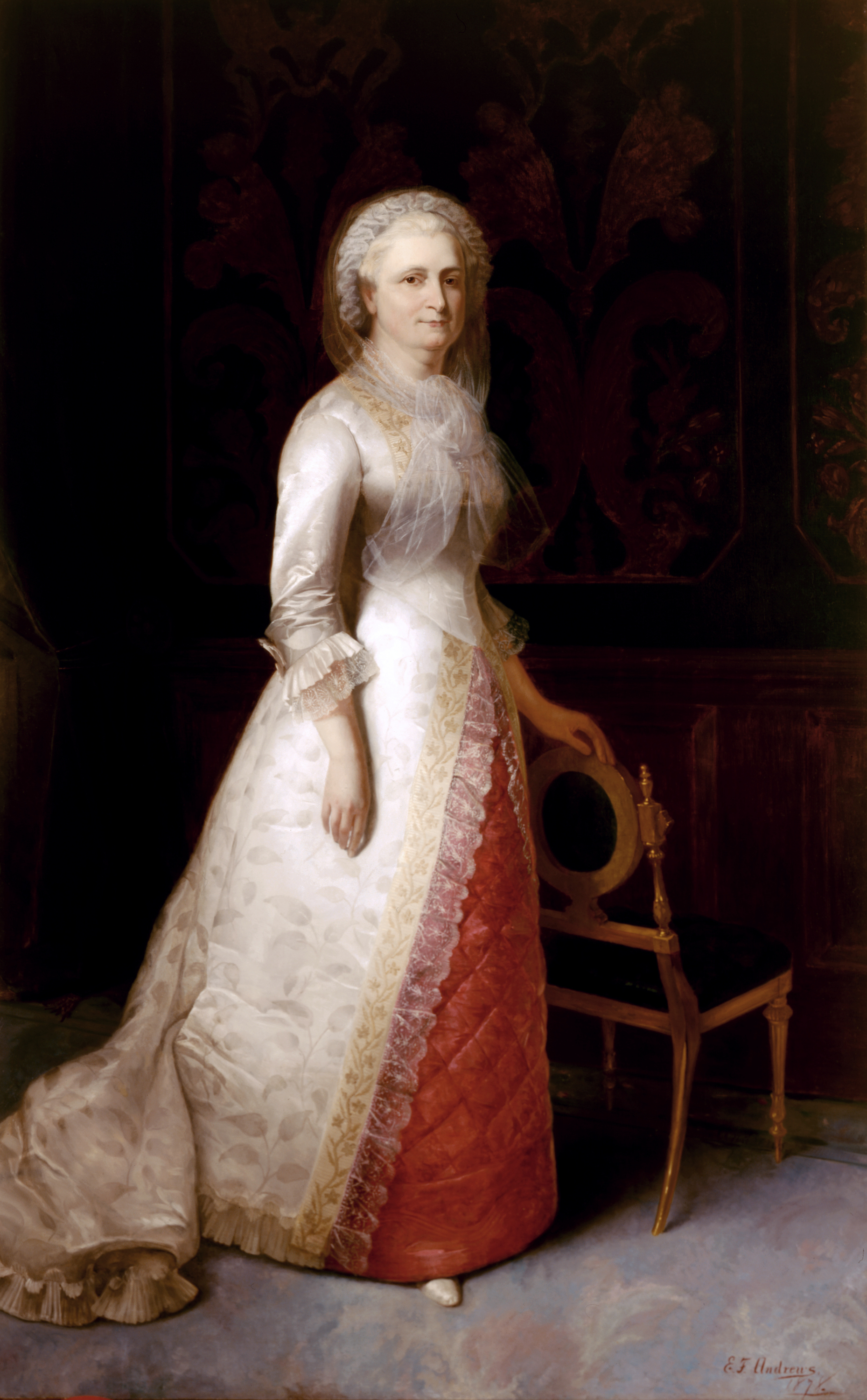
Andrews' full-length portrait of Martha Washington (1878), based on a head-and-bust oil sketch from life by Gilbert Stuart, shows anachronistic details of costume and the American Renaissance chair.

Several federal government agencies, mostly through the Architect of the Capitol, Edward Clark, commissioned Andrews to make copies of existing portraits. Thus, several of his portraits, are in The White House collection, including posthumous full-length portraits of Martha Washington (illustration), Thomas Jefferson and Andrew Johnson. His Poppies and Edge of a Stream are at the Smithsonian American Art Museum.

Former Kentucky Lieutenant Governor John C. Underwood, President of the United Confederate Veterans, commissioned Andrews to make twenty portraits of prominent Confederates for a proposed Confederate Museum in Richmond, Virginia. The project was embroiled in litigation, and eleven paintings were sold in 1910 for unpaid storage fees by a Covington, Kentucky, warehouse. Most ended up in Virginia (such as that of Gen. Robert E. Lee in the Westmoreland County Courthouse), but three are in the collection of the Kentucky Museum at Western Kentucky University. The Confederate Memorial Association, led by Virginia lieutenant governor James Taylor Ellyson and financed by Thomas Fortune Ryan did build its headquarters (the Confederate Memorial Institute a/k/a "Battle Abbey") in Richmond, which is now the Virginia Historical Society. Perhaps the most famous paintings therein are the "Four Seasons of the Confederacy" murals by Charles Hoffbauer.

Clarance Randolph Howard, son of Major William Key Howard of the Confederate States of America, great-grand-nephew of Francis Scott Key, and great-grandson of John Eager Howard (U.S. Senator and Governor of Maryland), commissioned Eliphalet Frazer Andrews to complete a portrait of his wife, Mary French Howard, in 1908. It is one of the few known remaining original portraits by the artist of a non-political or military official.

== Personal life ==
In 1895 Andrews married Marietta Fauntleroy Minnigerode (1869–1932). She was the daughter of Charles Ernest Frederick Minnigerode (1816–1891), rector of St. Paul's Church in Richmond, Virginia, and she was active in the Daughters of the Confederacy. E. F. Andrews was a member of the Metropolitan Club in Washington, D.C.

== Death and legacy ==
Andrews died in Washington, D.C., on March 15, 1915, and his remains were returned to Steubenville, Ohio. In 1917, his widow presented his portrait of Confederate General Nathan Bedford Forrest to the Confederate Memorial in Chattanooga, Tennessee.
