= Marietta Minnigerode Andrews =

American painter and designer (1869–1931)

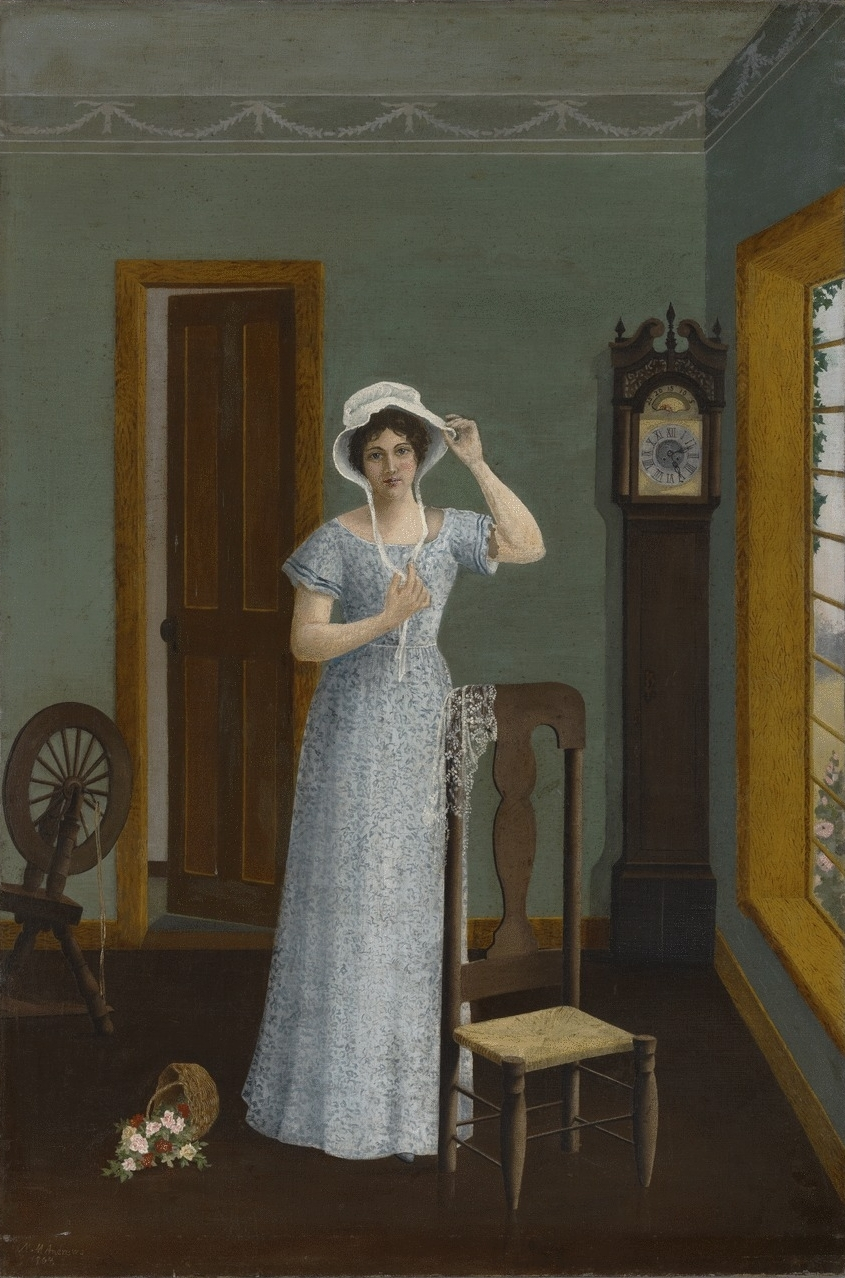
Figure of a Woman by Marietta Minnigerode Andrews, 1904

Marietta Fauntleroy Andrews (née Minnigerode; December 11, 1869 – August 7, 1931) was an American painter and designer.

== Biography ==
Andrews was born Marietta Fauntleroy Minnigerode in Richmond, Virginia. Her sister Lucy Minnigerode was head of the United States Public Health Service Nursing Corps.

She was of German descent, being the granddaughter of Charles Minnigerode, a revolutionary who fled to the United States in the 1830s due to his radical sentiments. She studied at the Corcoran School of Art in Washington, D.C. under Eliphalet Frazer Andrews, whom she would marry in 1895. She also studied in New York City with William Merritt Chase, with Luigi Chialiva of Paris, and Ernest Lieberman in Munich.

Beginning in 1890 she served as an assistant instructor at the Corcoran School. She visited Italy in 1892, and in 1896 became a founder member of the Washington Water Color Club. In 1920 she formed the National Monticello Association, one of a number of organizations formed to raise the funds to purchase Monticello, which had been put up for sale by its owner Jefferson Monroe Levy.

She produced designs for the stained glass windows of St. Paul's Church in Steubenville, Ohio. Her work may also be found at the University of Virginia, the George Washington University, and the American Society for Psychical Research. She published several books which she illustrated herself, including My Studio Window (1928); Scraps of Paper (1929); and George Washington's Country (1930); and also created silhouettes. She had two children, Mary Lord and Eliphalet Fraser. Towards the end of her life, she lived and worked on 16th Street in Washington, D.C. She died at her son's home, Vaucluse, in Alexandria, Virginia. She was buried in the family plot in Middleburg.

A sketchbook by Andrews, along with a collection of her drawings, was long held in the collection of the Corcoran Gallery of Art; at that institution's demise, all of these were transferred to the art museum at American University. A collection of her papers may be found at Virginia Commonwealth University.
