= Meade Minnigerode =

American novelist (1887–1967)

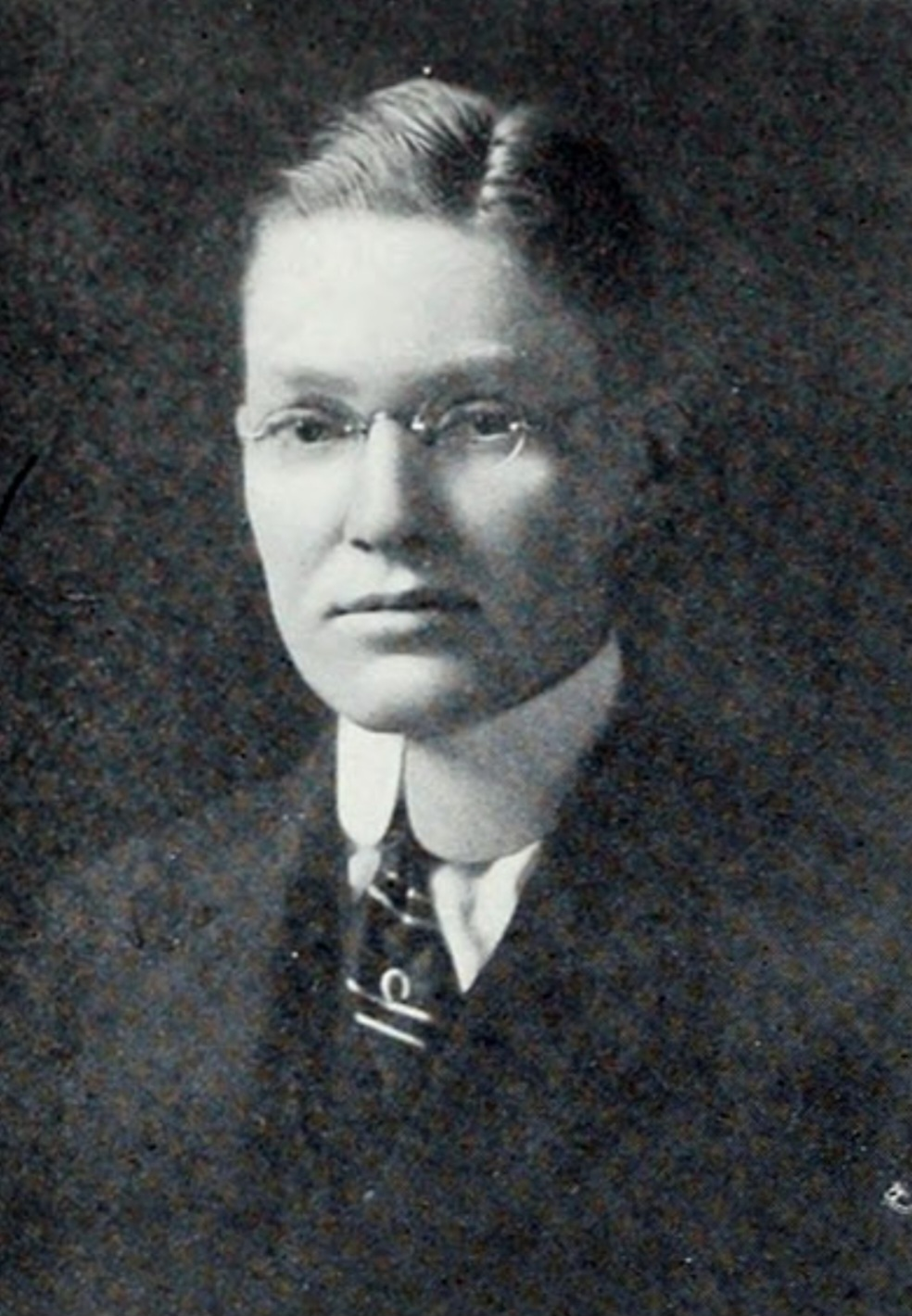
- Meade Minnegerode c. 1910
- Born: June 7, 1887; London, United Kingdom
- Died: October 27, 1967 (aged 80); Essex, Connecticut, US
- Education: Yale University
- Occupation: Author
- Writing career
- Genres: Historical fiction, Biography
- Notable work: The Whiffenpoof Song

Meade Minnigerode (June 7, 1887 – October 27, 1967) was an American author, poet, and historian. He was a prolific writer of popular history, fiction, and biography who published more than twenty books over five decades. Though in 1936 the New York Times wrote that he was "widely known for his biographical and historical books and articles," he is primarily remembered today for being the co-author of the lyrics of "The Whiffenpoof Song," the anthem of Yale University's oldest a cappella singing group that he helped found. The song that later became a hit recording for Rudy Vallée in 1937 and Bing Crosby in 1947.

== Early life and education ==
Minnigerode was born on June 19, 1887, in London to Persifor Frazer Gibson and Meade Minnigerode. He was the grandson of Charles Minnigerode (1814–1894), a German-born classicist and Episcopal clergyman who taught Latin and Greek at the College of William & Mary and served for thirty-three years as rector of St. Paul's Episcopal Church, "the Cathedral of the Confederacy" during the American Civil War.

Minnegerode attended the Harrow School in London before coming to the United States to enroll at Yale University. At Yale, he joined the Elihu Club and was a founding member of the Whiffenpoofs, an cappella singing group. He graduated in 1910.

== Career ==
Following his graduation, Minnigerode embarked on a career as a writer in New York City. He was noted for his constant presence at the Yale Club of New York City—a 1926 Time Magazine review of his novel Cordelia Chantrell referred to him as the "haunting wraith of the New York Yale Club."

Minnegerode's historical works drew on archival sources and ranged across American social history, presidential biography, early French history, and the careers of major financial figures. Notably, while doing research at the New York Public Library in 1922, he discovered a series of letters exchanged among Herman Melville's family that referenced a major, unpublished 1853 text. There is debate among scholars about whether this text, written after the commercial failure of Moby-Dick, was a lost novel called Isle of the Cross. In 1929, while doing research for another project, Minnegerode would garner some media attention for claiming to have found evidence that French fishermen reached North America before Christopher Columbus did.

During World War I, Minnigerode represented the United States Shipping Board in France in 1917–1918, and in the following year served as a first lieutenant with the American Red Cross. During World War II, he served with the Aircraft Warning Service in Connecticut and privately published Essex Post (1944), a record of that service limited to 175 copies.

== The Whiffenpoof Song ==
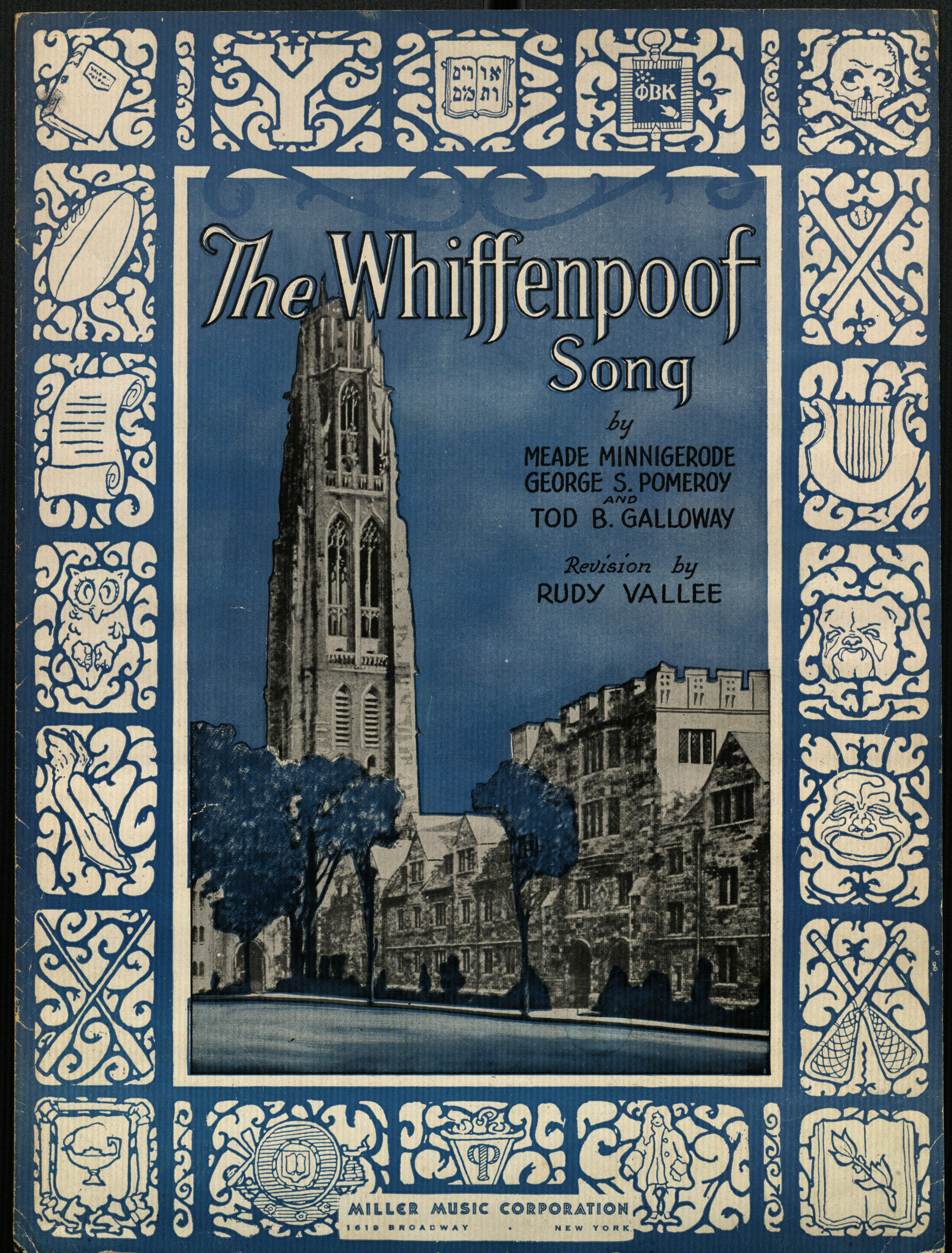
The Whiffenpoof Song, co-written by Meade Minnegerode

While a student at Yale, Minnigerode and fellow student George S. Pomeroy adapted the lyrics of Rudyard Kipling's poem "Gentlemen-Rankers," which had been set to music by Tod B. Galloway, to create "The Whiffenpoof Song." The song was published in sheet music form in 1909 and became the traditional closing number of the Whiffenpoofs.

== Personal life ==
Minnegerode married Mildred Bright Mailliard in 1936.
