= Friedrich Ludwig Weidig =

German theologian

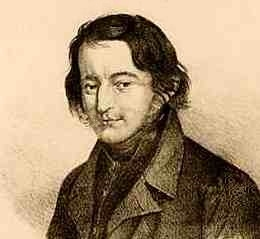
- Weidig
- Born: 15 February 1791; Oberkleen district, Langgöns, northwest Wetterau
- Died: 23 February 1837 (aged 46)
- Occupations: Protestant theologian, pastor, activist, teacher and journalist

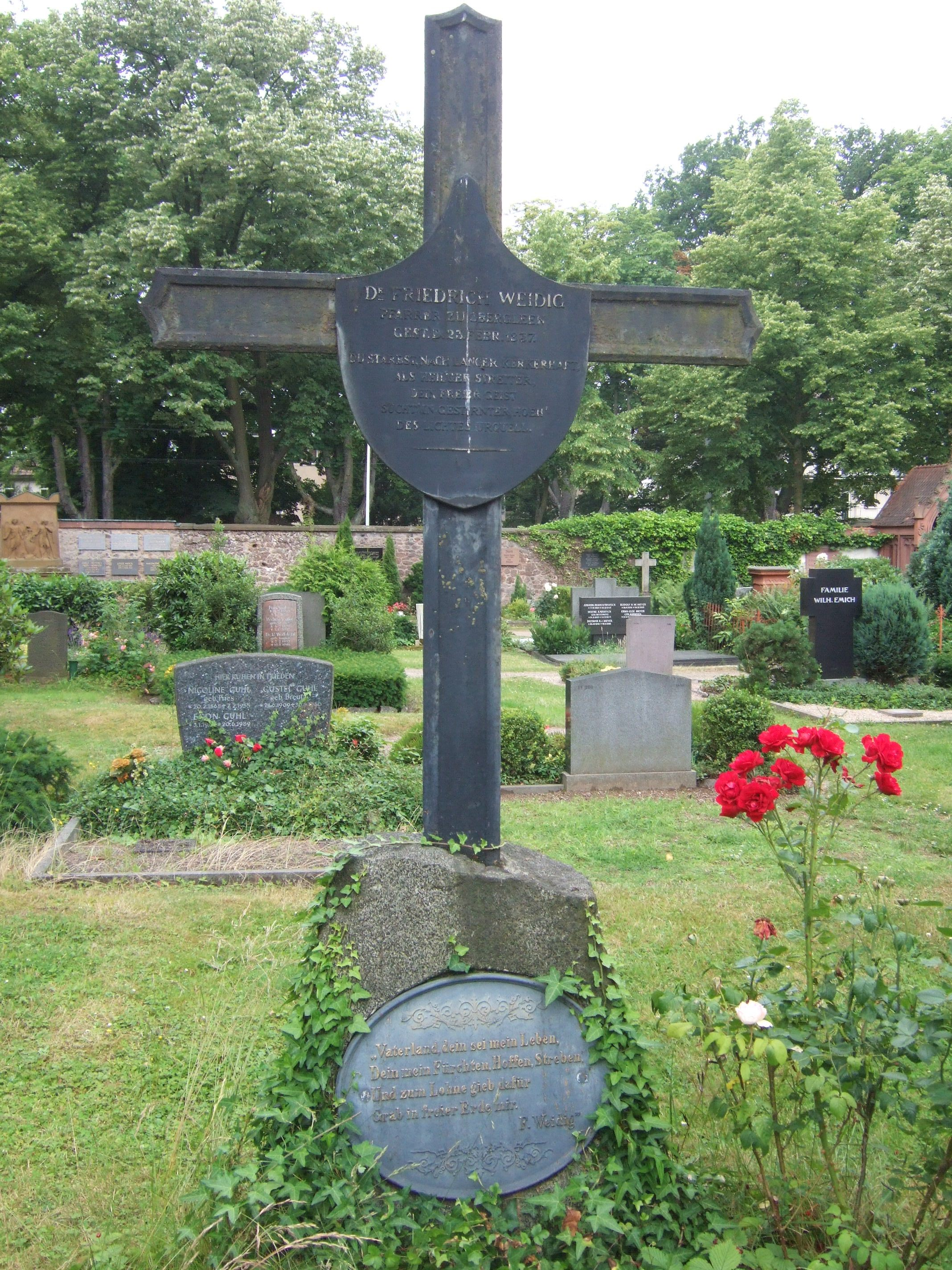
Grave of Friedrich Ludwig Weidig in the Alter Friedhof in Darmstadt

Friedrich Ludwig Weidig (15 February 1791 – 23 February 1837) was a German Protestant theologian, pastor, activist, teacher and journalist. Initially working as a teacher in Butzbach, he then spent a short time as a pastor in Ober-Gleen, a district of Giessen. In what is now Hesse and the Middle Rhine, he was one of the main figures of the Vormärz and a pioneer of the 1848 Revolution.

== Biography ==
Weidig was born in the Oberkleen district, Langgöns, northwest of Wetterau.

The son of a chief forester and his wife, her maiden name being Liebknecht. He went to Butzbach in 1803 to go to school. During his theological studies in the Ludoviciana in Gießen he was a member of the 'fränkischen Landsmannschaft'. In 1812 he became headmaster at the boys' school in Butzbach. Following Friedrich Ludwig Jahn's example, Weidig taught his pupils drill and physical exercise and in 1814 founded a parade ground on the Schrenzer, a north-eastern foothill of the Taunus - later historians and biographers thus called him the "father of Hessian drill".

From 1818 Weidig was monitored by the authorities for his political activities in teaching, preaching and in private - he was one of the liberal democrats who aspired to establish Germany as a unified democratic nation state. In 1832 he thus travelled to south-west Germany and helped in the preparations for the Hambach Festival.

In 1833 Weidig was arrested for the first time, but in 1834 he still published four illegal issues of "Leuchter und Beleuchter für Hessen (oder der Hessen Notwehr)". The same year saw his first meeting with Georg Büchner, with whom he worked on a manuscript that Weidig then published against Büchner's wishes as Der Hessische Landbote. Weidig and his students also organised the printing and distribution of illegal pamphlets.

On 5 April 1834 Weidig was suspended from his teaching post and demoted to a small village called Ober-Gleen, now in Kirtorf, im Vogelsberg. When the "Hessischer Landbote" project was betrayed in summer 1834, Büchner fled to Straßburg but Weidig refused to emigrate to Switzerland with his family. Soon afterwards he was arrested in the Klosterkaserne barracks in Friedberg and in June 1835 put into house arrest in Darmstadt, where on 23 February 1837 he committed suicide after two years' questioning and physical abuse by state investigators, including Konrad Georgi, a known alcoholic. Ill and desperate, he had written letters to his wife from prison, which were retained by his questioners "for state-political reasons" for many years after his death. His friends noted on his gravestone that he was a freedom fighter, but this was bricked up by the authorities.

== Namesakes ==
The Weidigschule gymnasium-school in Butzbach is named after him, as is the Weidigsporthalle in Oberkleen.

== Bibliography ==
- Weidig, Friedrich Ludwig: Gesammelte Schriften. Herausgegeben von Hans-Joachim Müller. Darmstadt 1987 (Hessische Beiträge zur deutschen Literatur)
  [enthält eine ausführliche Chronologie zu Leben und Werk (S. 497-681)]

== Sources ==
- Ernst Weber: Ein antiabsolutistisches Programm in Versen. Friedrich Ludwig Weidigs Liederbüchlein aller Teutschen (1815). - In: Georg Büchner Jahrbuch 8(1990–94) [1995], S. 126-209
- (in German) Harald Braun: Das turnerische und politische Wirken von Alexander Friedrich Ludwig Weidig 1791-1837. Diss.sport.wiss.Köln, Ahrensburg 1977
  [2., erg. u. durch eine Dokumentation erw. Aufl. u.d.T.: Das politische und turnerische Wirken von Friedrich Ludwig Weidig. Ein Beitrag zur Geschichte der revolutionären Bestrebungen im deutschen Vormärz. St. Augustin 1983 (Schriften der Deutschen Sporthochschule Köln 11)]
- (in German) Friedrich Ludwig Weidig, 1791-1837: neue Beiträge zur 200. Wiederkehr seines Geburtstages. hrsg. vom Magistrat der Stadt Butzbach [...] in Verbindung mit dem Butzbacher Geschichtsverein; [Red.: Dieter Wolf und Annette Reiter. Beiträge: Hans-Joachim Müller u.a.]. Butzbach 1991
  [enthält Bibliographie des Schrifttums 1918- 1990 (S. 136-180)]
- Bodo Heil: Weidigs Nachleben. (Zum 150. Todestag Dr. Friedrich Ludwig Weidigs). In: Wetterauer Geschichtsblätter 35 (1986), S. 73-126
- (in German) Thomas Michael Mayer: Büchner und Weidig - Frühkommunismus und revolutionäre Demokratie. Zur Textverteilung des Hessischen Landboten. In: Heinz Ludwig Arnold (Ed.): Georg Büchner I/II. München, 1979 (Text + Kritik. Sonderband), S. 16-298
  [in der 2., verbesserten und um ein Register vermehrten Auflage 1982, S. 16-298 u. 463]
- (in German) Thomas Michael Mayer u.a. (Bearb.): Georg Büchner. Leben, Werk, Zeit. Eine Ausstellung zum 150. Jahrestag des "Hessischen Landboten". Katalog. Unter Mitwirkung von Bettina Bischoff u.a. bearb. von Thomas Michael Mayer, Marburg 1985
  [2. wesentlich verbesserte u. vermehrte Aufl. 1986; 3.Aufl. 1987]
- (in German) Karl Mihm: ÄÄAlex. Friedrich Ludwig Weidig. Ein Beitrag zur Geschichte des vormärzlichen Liberalismus. In: Archiv für Hessische Geschichte und Altertumskunde, Neue Folge 15 (1928), S. 348-384 u. 574-608
  [auch selbständig erschienen: Darmstadt 1929]
- (in German) Friedrich Wilhelm Schulz: Der Tod des Pfarrers Dr. Friedrich Ludwig Weidig. Ein aktenmäßiger und urkundlich belegter Beitrag zur Beurteilung des geheimen Strafprozesses und der politischen Zustände Deutschlands. Literarisches Comptoir, Der Landbote, Zürich und Winterthur 1843
  [Erste Dokumentation der mörderischen Umstände, unter denen Weidig gefangen gehalten und verhört wurde. Die Schrift löste eine breite Debatte aus.]
- (in German) Arthur Wyß: Weidig, Friedrich Ludwig. In: Allgemeine Deutsche Biographie (ADB). Volume 41, Duncker & Humblot, Leipzig 1896, S. 450–453.
