= Georg Büchner =

German dramatist (1813–1837)

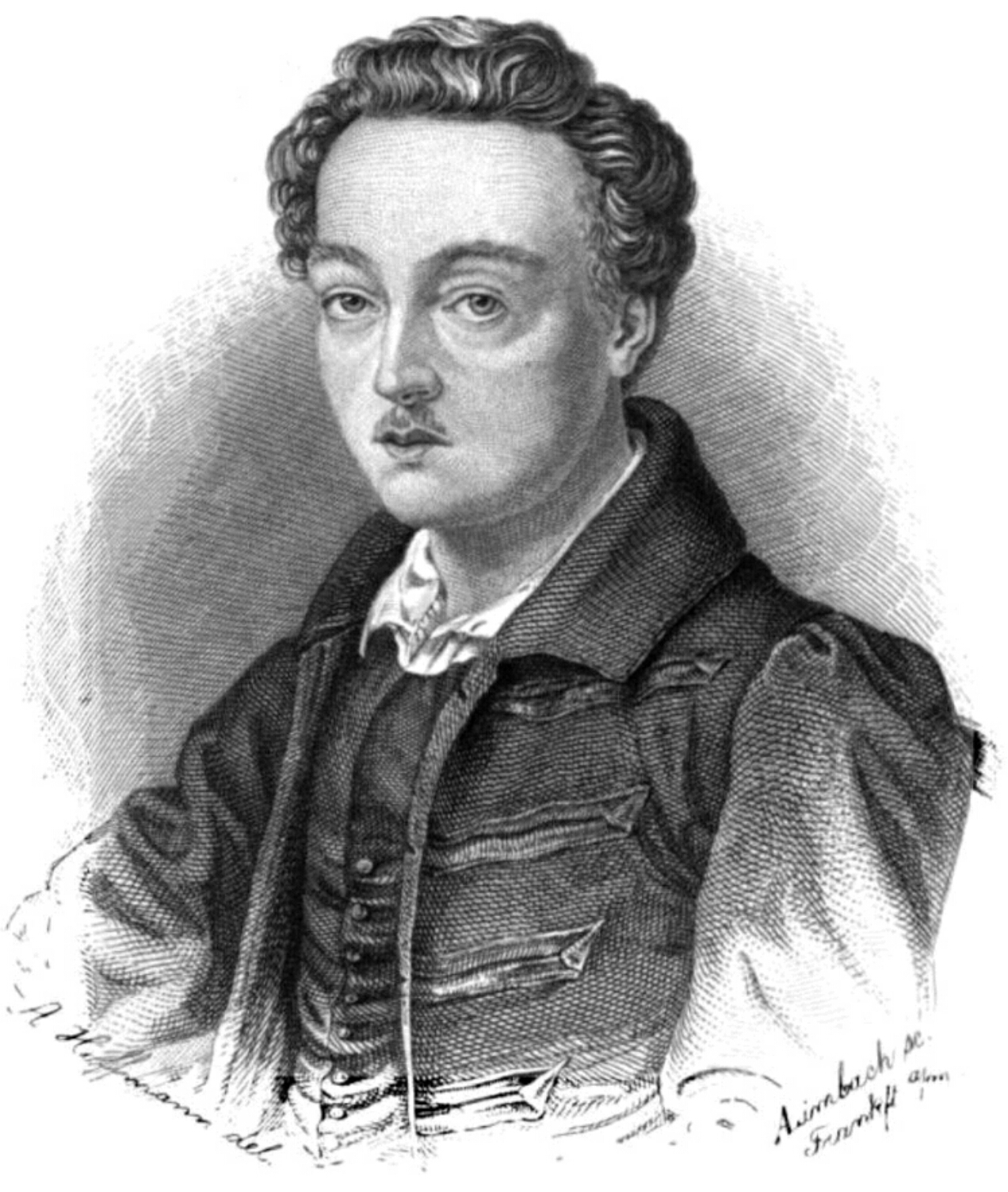
- Pencil drawing of Büchner, c. 1835
- Born: Karl Georg Büchner; 17 October 1813; Goddelau, Grand Duchy of Hesse
- Died: 19 February 1837 (aged 23); Zürich, Switzerland
- Education: University of Strassburg, University of Giessen
- Occupation: Dramatist
- Relatives: Ludwig Büchner, Luise Büchner, Ernst Büchner
- Writing career
- Notable works: Danton's Death; Leonce and Lena; Woyzeck

Karl Georg Büchner (17 October 1813 – 19 February 1837) was a German dramatist and writer of poetry and prose, considered part of the Young Germany movement. He was also a revolutionary and the brother of physician and philosopher Ludwig Büchner. His literary achievements, though limited by his death at age 23, are generally held in great esteem in Germany. Despite his brief career, his plays profoundly influenced naturalism, expressionism, and later developments in European theater.

At the age of 21, Büchner, with others, wrote a pamphlet entitled The Hessian Courier that has been called the most revolutionary manifesto of the nineteenth century before The Communist Manifesto.

== Life and career ==
Born in Goddelau (now part of Riedstadt) in the Grand Duchy of Hesse as the son of a physician, Büchner attended the Darmstadt gymnasium, a humanistic secondary school.

In 1828, he became interested in politics and joined a circle of William Shakespeare aficionados, which later on probably became the Giessen and Darmstadt section of the Society for Human Rights (Gesellschaft für Menschenrechte).

In 1831, at age 18, he began to study medicine in Strasbourg. In Strasbourg, he immersed himself in French literature and political thought. He was influenced by the utopian communist theories of François-Noël Babeuf and Claude Henri de Saint-Simon. In 1833, he moved to Giessen and continued his studies at the local university.

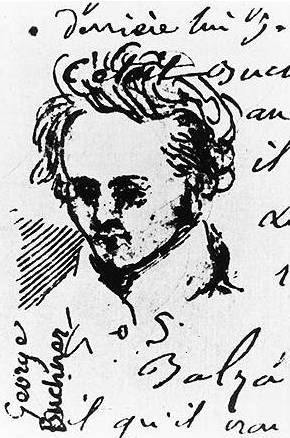
Büchner in a 1833/34 drawing by his friend Alexis Muston

While Büchner continued his studies in Giessen, he established a secret society dedicated to the revolutionary cause. In July 1834, with the help of evangelical theologian Friedrich Ludwig Weidig, he published the leaflet Der Hessische Landbote (The Hessian Courier), a revolutionary pamphlet critical of social injustice in the Grand Duchy of Hesse. The authorities charged them with treason and issued a warrant for their arrest. Weidig was arrested, tortured and later died in prison in Darmstadt; Büchner managed to flee across the border to Strasbourg, where he wrote most of his literary work and translated two French plays by Victor Hugo, Lucrèce Borgia and Marie Tudor. Two years later, his medical dissertation, "Mémoire sur le Système Nerveux du Barbeau (Cyprinus barbus L.)" was published in Paris and Strasbourg. In October 1836, after receiving his M.D. and being appointed by the University of Zürich as a lecturer in anatomy, Büchner relocated to Zürich, where he spent his final months writing and teaching until his death from typhus at the age of twenty-three.

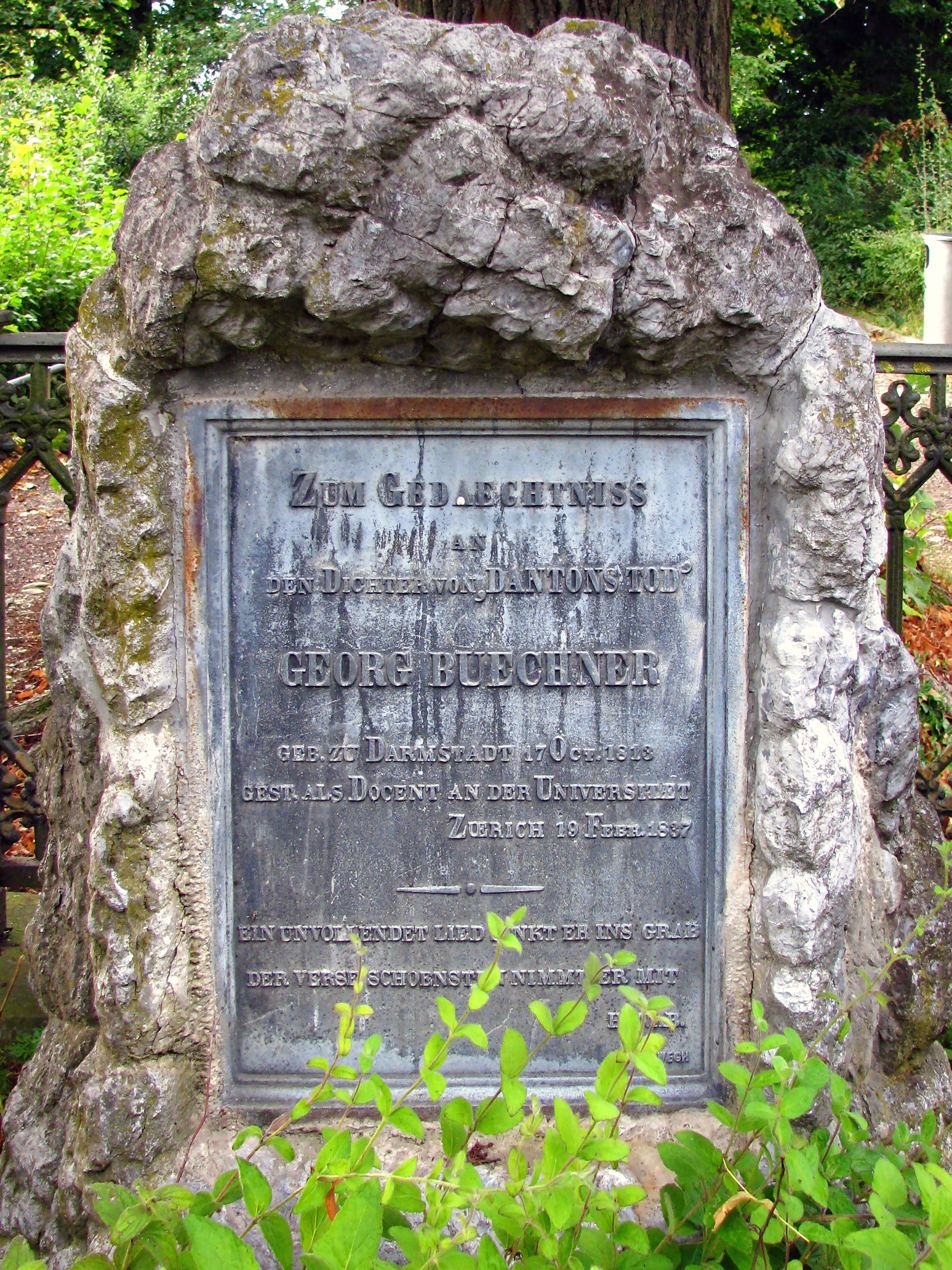
Gravestone of Georg Büchner on Germaniahügel in Zürich-Oberstrass

His first play, Dantons Tod (Danton's Death), about the French Revolution, was published in 1835, followed by Lenz (first partly published in Karl Gutzkow's and Wienberg's Deutsche Revue, which was quickly banned). Lenz is a novella based on the life of the Sturm und Drang poet Jakob Michael Reinhold Lenz. In 1836, his second play, Leonce and Lena, satirized the nobility. His unfinished and most famous play, Woyzeck, exists only in fragments and was published posthumously.

== Legacy ==
By the 1870s, Büchner was nearly forgotten in Germany when Karl Emil Franzos edited his works; these later became a major influence on the naturalist and expressionist movements. Arnold Zweig described Lenz, Büchner's only work of prose fiction, as "the beginning of modern European prose".

The play Woyzeck became the basis for many adaptations, including Alban Berg's landmark atonal opera Wozzeck, which premiered in 1925, and Werner Herzog's 1979 film Woyzeck (see main article, Woyzeck, for a full list). Woyzeck has been included in the curriculum for students in grade 12 in Germany.

A German literary Georg Büchner Prize is awarded annually. It was created in 1923.

== Works ==
- The Hessian Courier, 1834 – in cooperation with Friedrich Ludwig Weidig (Flugschrift)
- Danton's Death, 1835 (Drama)
- Lenz, 1835 (Novella, unfinished)
- Leonce and Lena, 1836 (Comedy)
- Woyzeck, 1837 (Drama – fragment)
- Pietro Aretino, his drama about Pietro Aretino, has been lost.
- Translations:
  - Lucrezia Borgia, 1835 (Of the play by Victor Hugo)
  - Maria Tudor, 1835 (Of the play by Victor Hugo)

=== Editions ===
- Georg Büchner: Sämtliche Werke und Schriften. Marburger Ausgabe. Hrsg. v. Burghard Dedner und Thomas Michael Mayer. Wissenschaftliche Buchgesellschaft, Darmstadt 2000. ISBN 3-534-14520-8, The standard critical edition.
- Georg Büchner: Werke und Briefe. Münchener Ausgabe. Hrsg. v. Karl Pörnbacher, Gerhard Schaub, Hans-Joachim Simm, Edda Ziegler. 8. Auflage. Hanser, München 2001, S.67–133. ISBN 3-423-12374-5.
- Georg Büchner, Dichtungen, Schriften, Briefe und Dokumente (Deutscher Klassiker Verlag, 2006). ISBN 978-3-618-68013-0.

=== Translations ===
- Büchner, Georg (1928). The plays of Georg Büchner. Translated by Dunlop, Geoffrey. New York: Viking.
- Büchner, Georg (1963). Complete Plays and Prose. Translated by Mueller, Carl Richard. New York: Hill & Wang. pp. 1–71.
- Büchner, Georg (1971). Danton's Death Leonce and Lena Woyzeck. Translated by Price, Victor. Oxford: Oxford University Press. ISBN 978-0-19-283650-2.
- Büchner, Georg (1977). The Complete Collected Works. Translated by Schmidt, Henry J. New York: Avon. ISBN 0380018152.
- Büchner, Georg (1993). Complete Plays, Lenz and Other Writings. Translated by Reddick, John. London: Penguin. pp. 1–73. ISBN 9780140445862.
- Red Yucca – German Poetry in Translation (trans. Eric Plattner)
