= Moritz von Schwind =

Austrian painter (1804–1871)

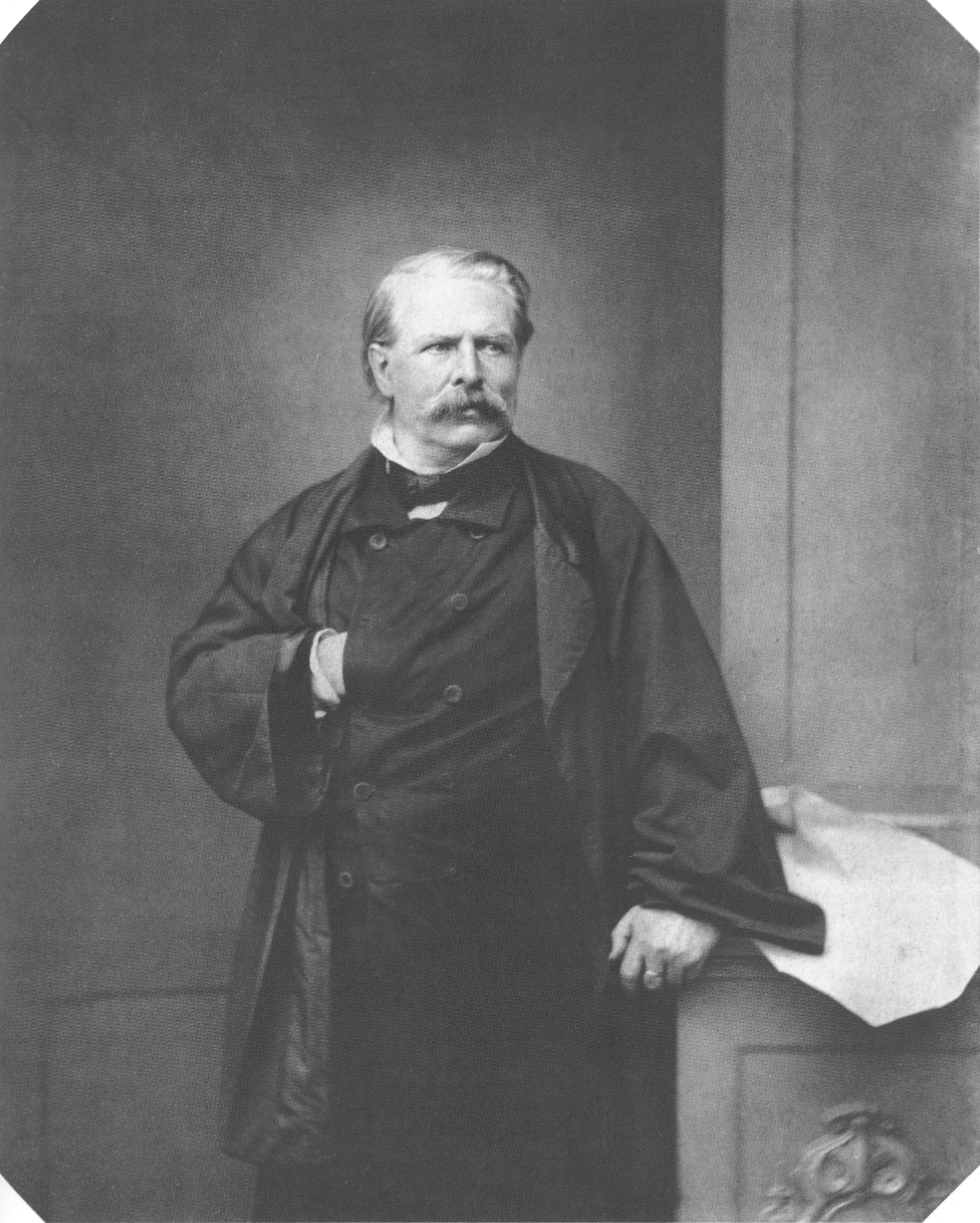
Moritz von Schwind, c. 1860.

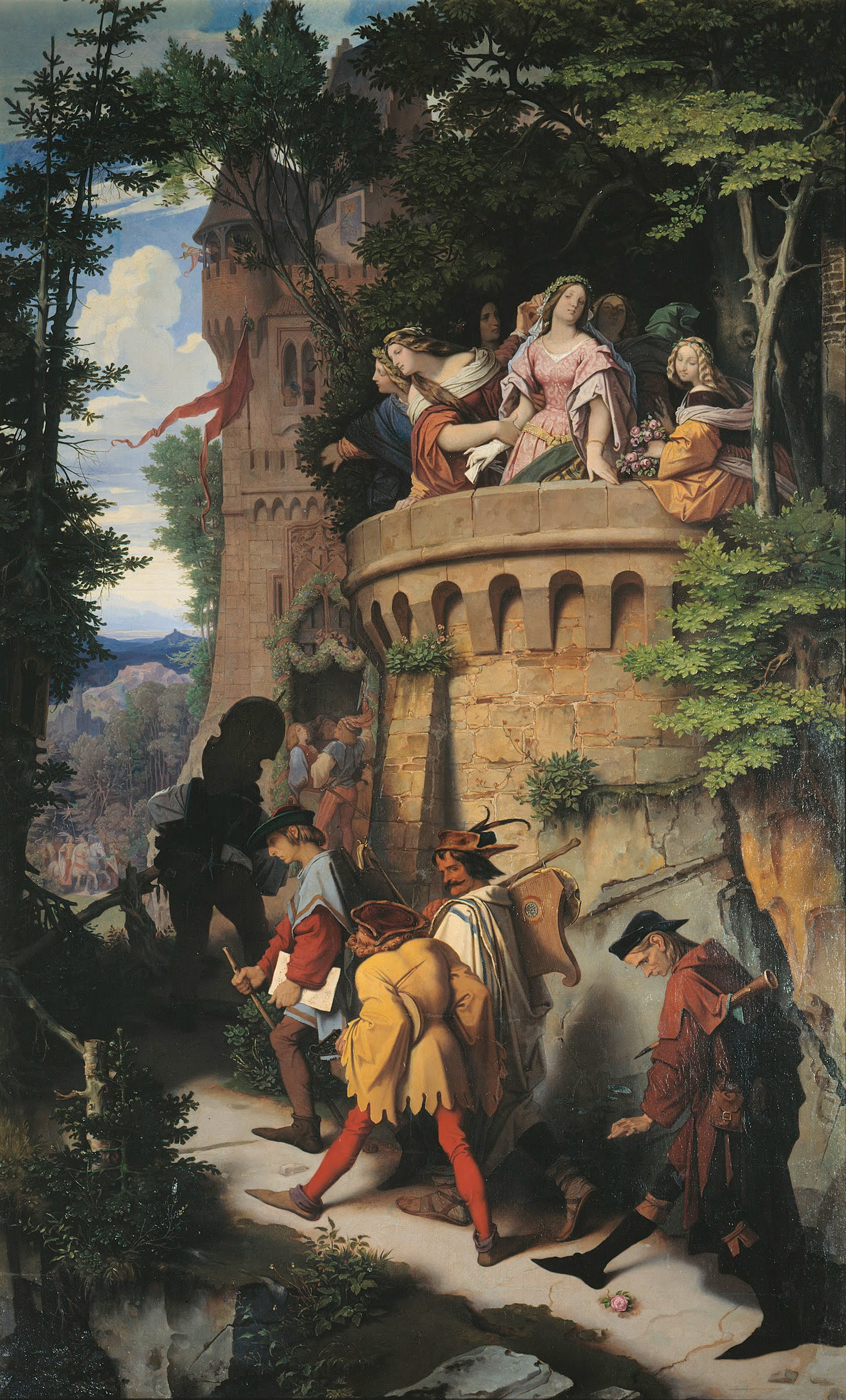
The Rose, or the Artist's Journey. 1846

Moritz von Schwind (21 January 1804 – 8 February 1871) was an Austrian painter, born in Vienna. Schwind's genius was lyrical—he drew inspiration from chivalry, folklore, and the songs of the people. Schwind died in Pöcking in Bavaria, and was buried in the Alter Südfriedhof in Munich.

== Life and career ==
Moritz von Schwind received rudimentary training and spent a happy and carefree youth in Vienna. Among his companions was the composer Schubert, some of whose songs he illustrated. In 1828, the year of Schubert's death, he moved to Munich, where he befriended the painter Schnorr and enjoyed the guidance of Cornelius, then director of the Academy.

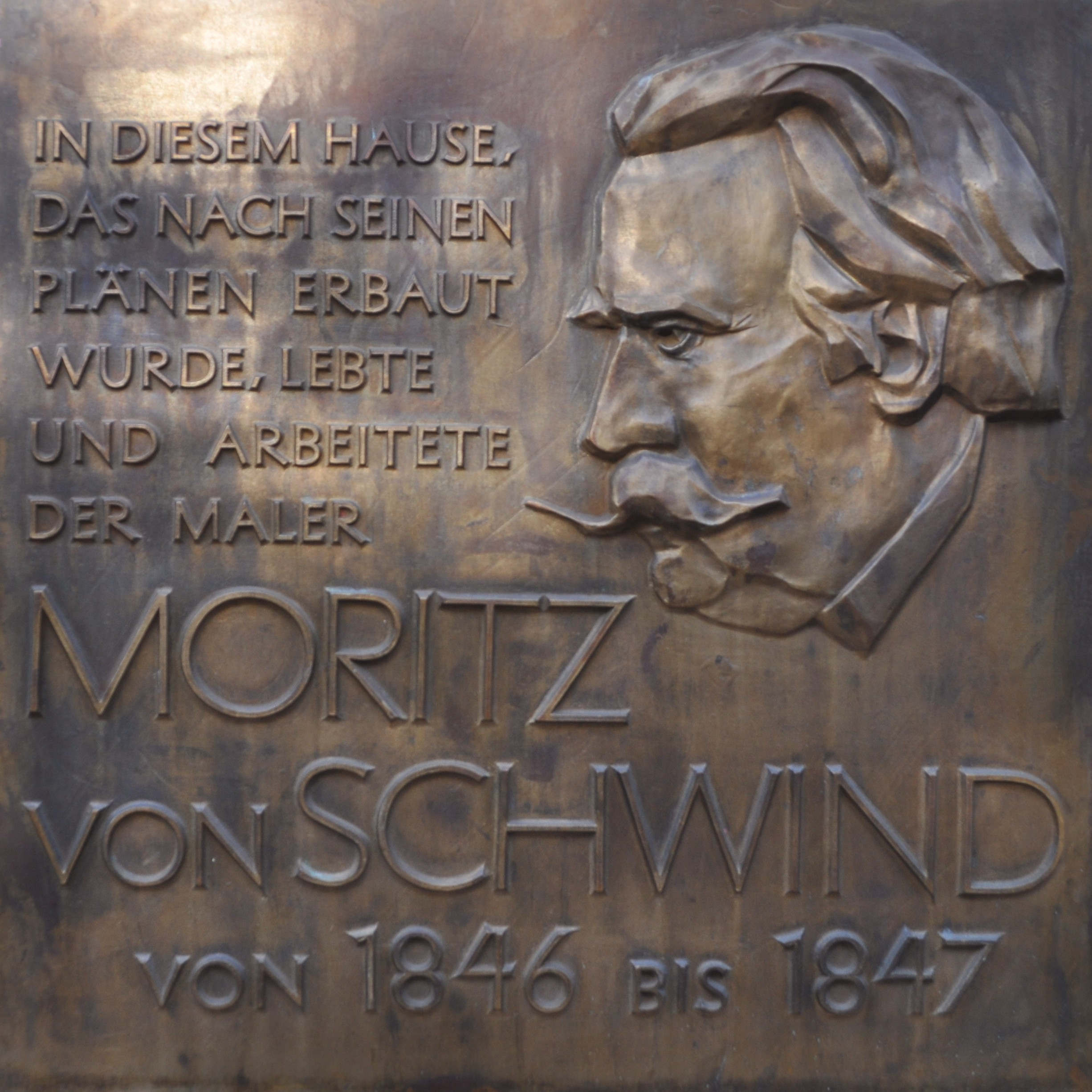
Frankfurt, Schwindhaus

In 1834, he was commissioned to decorate King Ludwig's new palace with wall paintings illustrating the works of the poet Tieck. He also found in the same place congenial sport for his fancy in a "Kinderfries". He was often busy working on almanacs, and on illustrating Goethe and other writers through which he gained considerable recognition and employment.

In the revival of art in Germany, Schwind held as his own the sphere of poetic fancy. In 1839 he was entrusted with the new Karlsruhe academy, itself an embodiment in fresco of ideas thrown out by Goethe. He decorated a villa in Leipzig with the story of Cupid and Psyche, and further justified his title of poet-painter with designs from the Niebelungenlied and Tasso's Gerusalemme for the walls of the castle of Hohenschwangau in Bavaria.

From the year 1844 dates his residence in Frankfurt, during which he created some of his finest easel pictures, most notably the "Singers' Contest" in the Wartburg (1846), as well as designs for the Goethe celebration. There were also numerous book illustrations. The conceptions for the most part are better than the execution.

In 1847, Schwind returned to Munich on being appointed professor in the academy. Eight years later his fame was at its height on the completion in the castle of the Wartburg of wall pictures illustrative of the "Singers' Contest" and of the history of Elizabeth of Hungary.

The compositions received universal praise, and at a grand musical festival in their honour, Schwind himself was one of the violinists. In Munich he also worked on some churches, particularly the altar and windows of the Church of Our Lady.

His exceptionally mature cycle, "Seven Ravens" from Grimm's fairy stories, was produced in 1857. In the same year he visited England to report officially to King Ludwig on the Manchester art treasures. So diversified were his gifts that he turned his hand to church windows and joined his old friend Schnorr in designs for the painted glass in Glasgow Cathedral.

Towards the close of his career, with broken health and his powers on the wane, he revisited Vienna. During this time, he created the cycle from the legend of Melusine and the designs commemorative of chief musicians which decorate the foyer of the Vienna State Opera. Cornelius writes, "You have translated the joy of music into pictorial art."

== Selected paintings ==
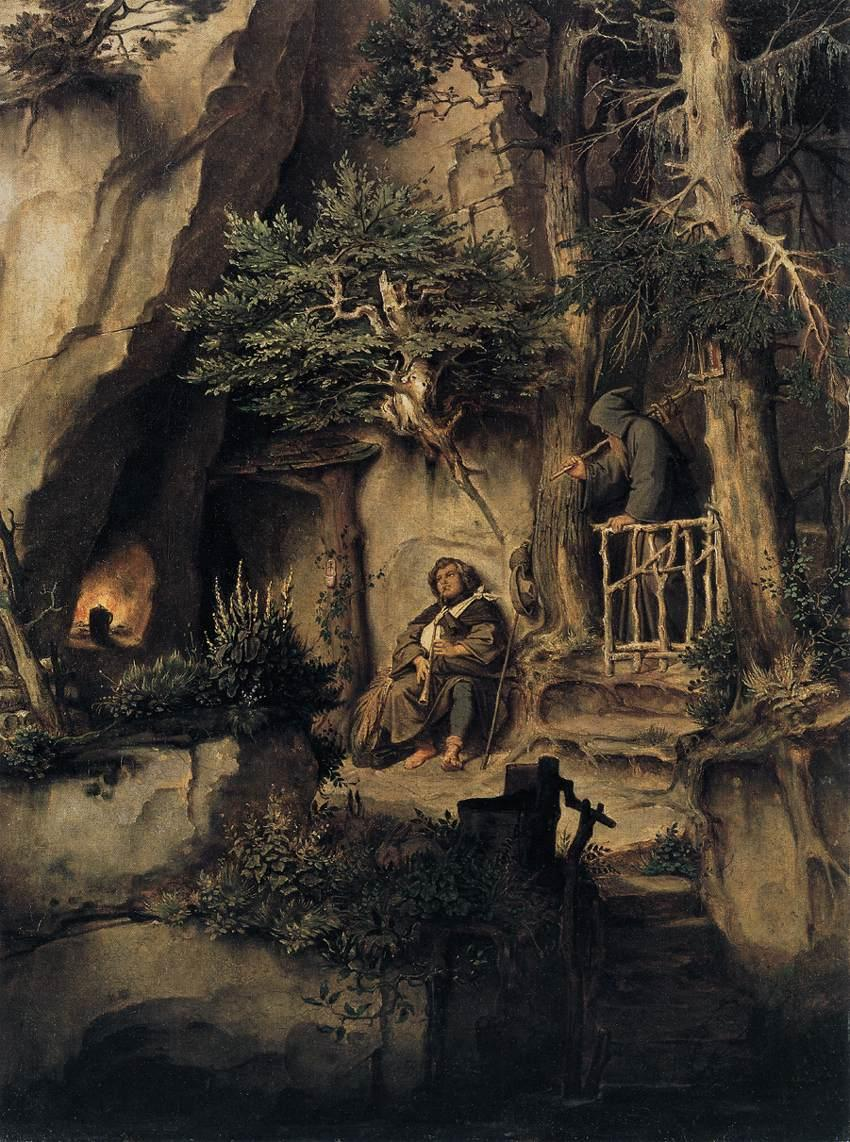
A Player with a Hermit (1846)

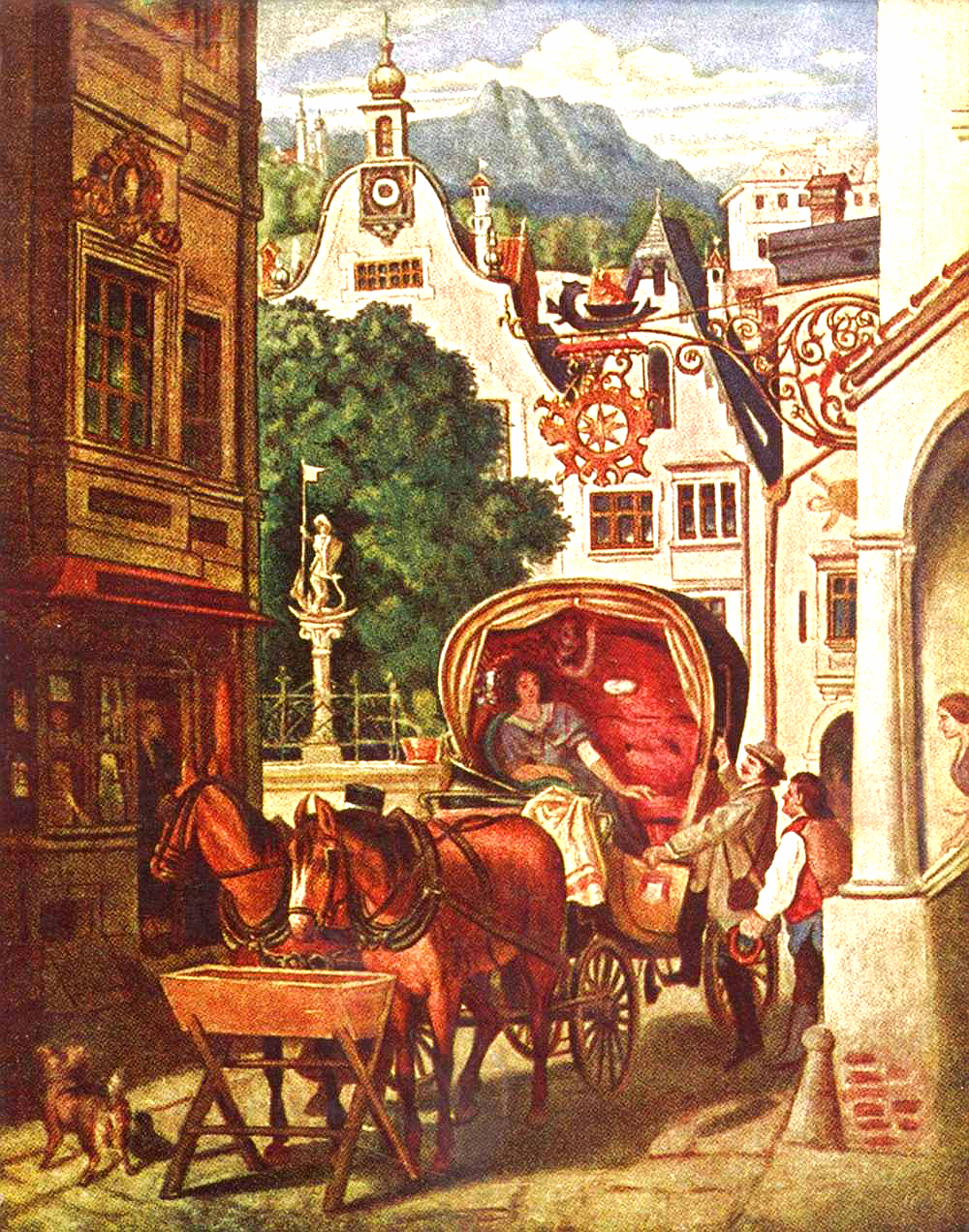
Honeymoon (1867)

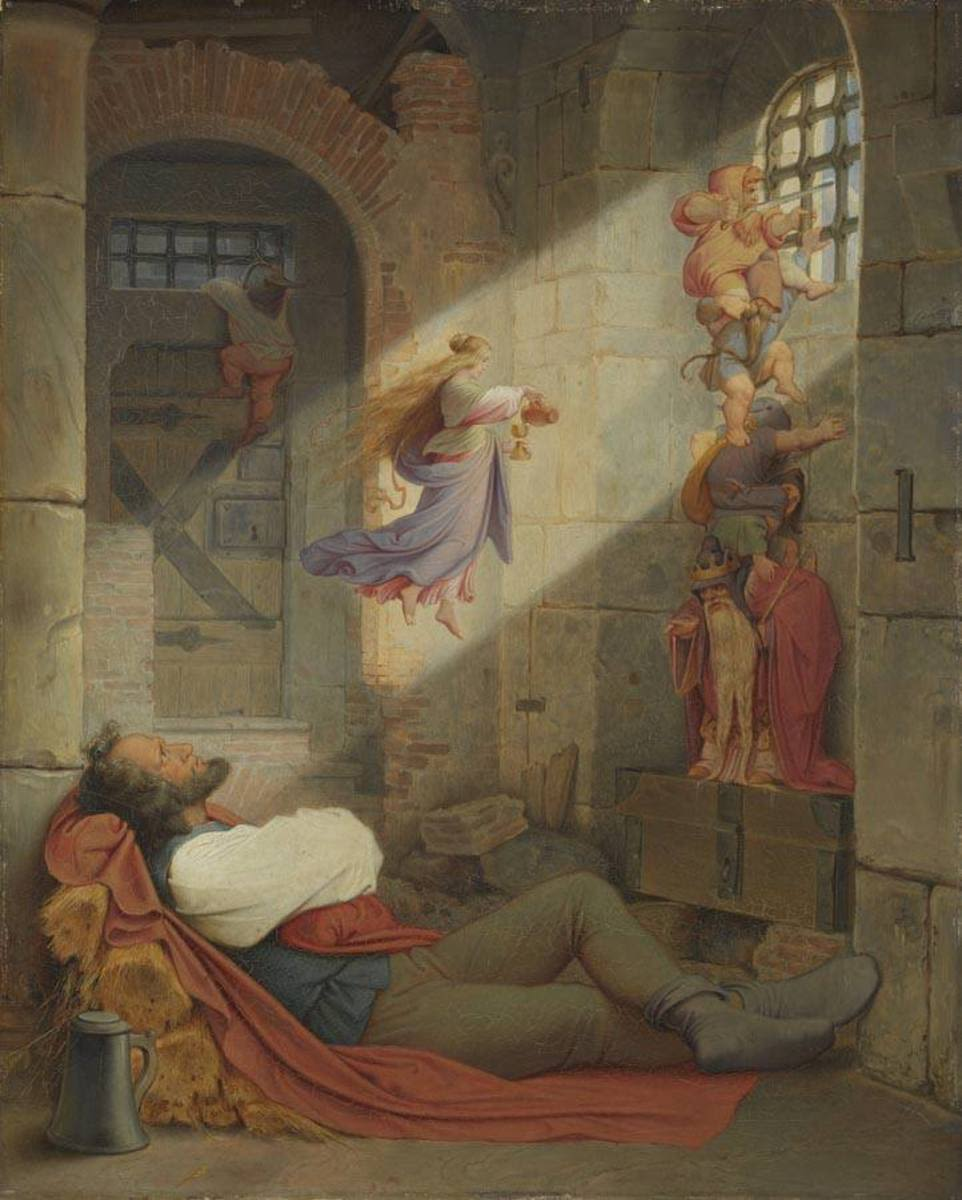
The Dream of the Prisoner (1836)

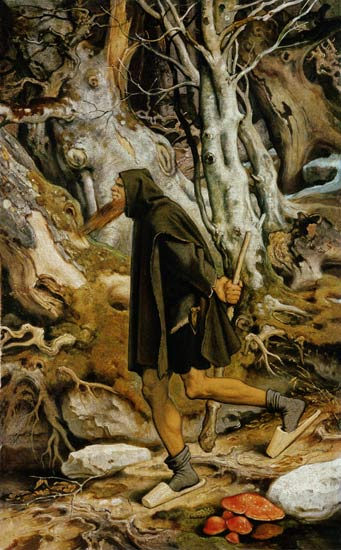
Rübezahl (1845)

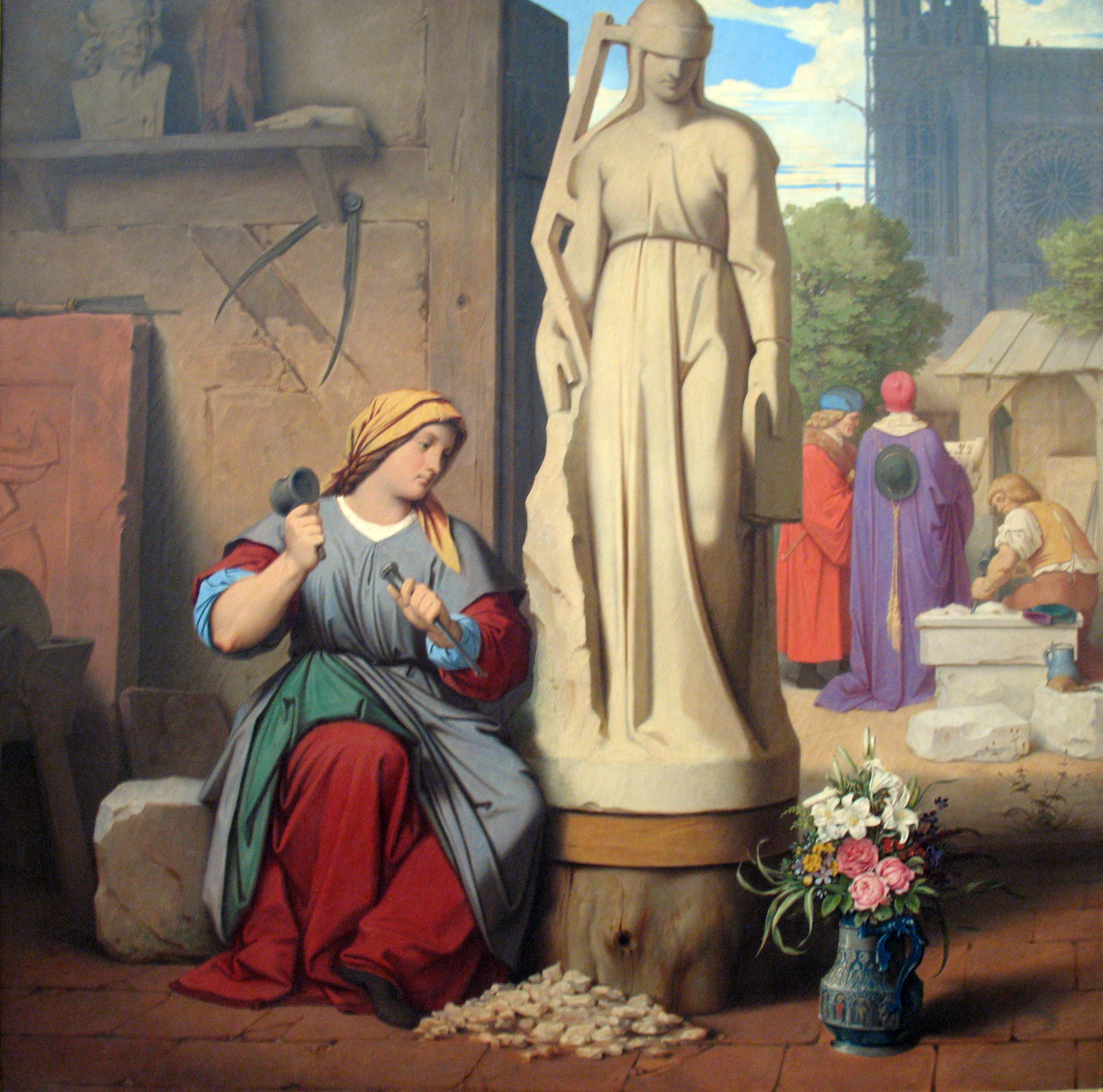
Sabina of Steinbach (1844)

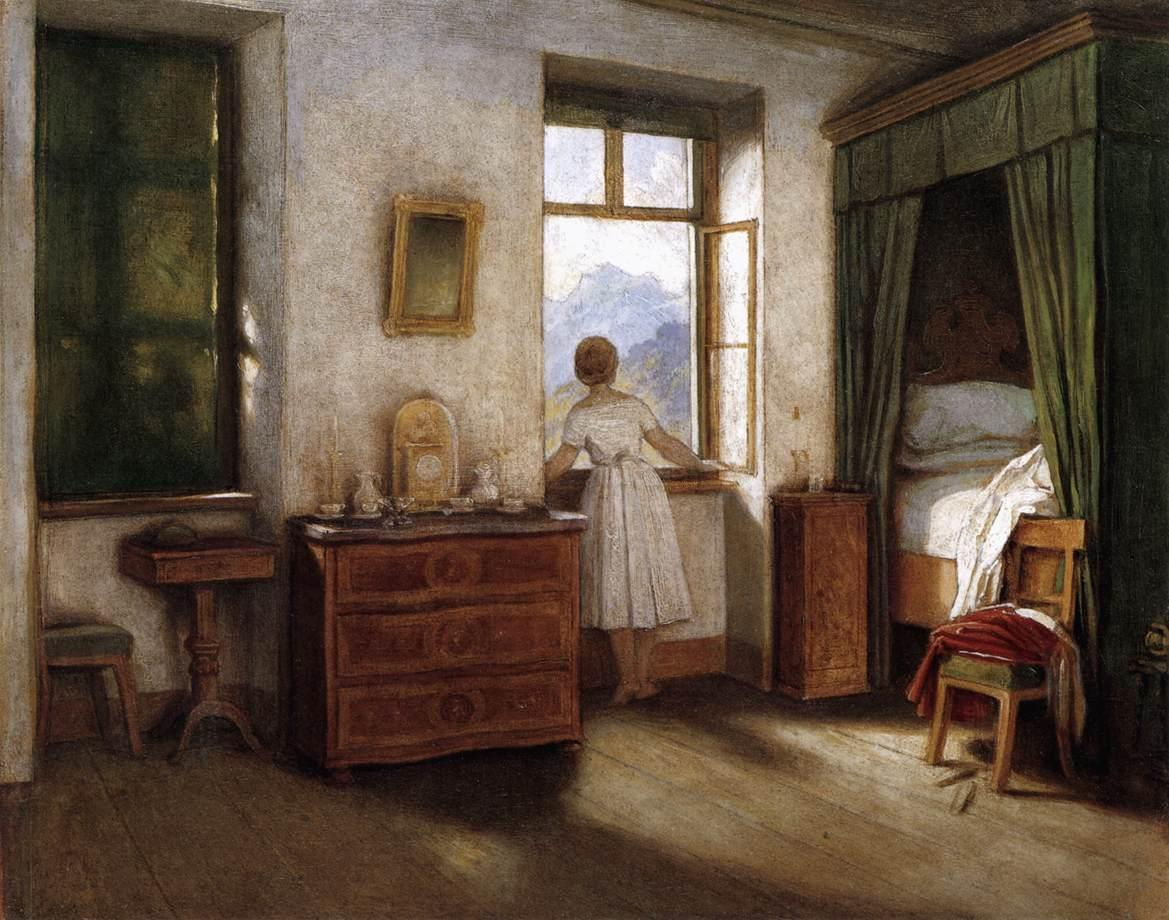
Early Morning, (1858)

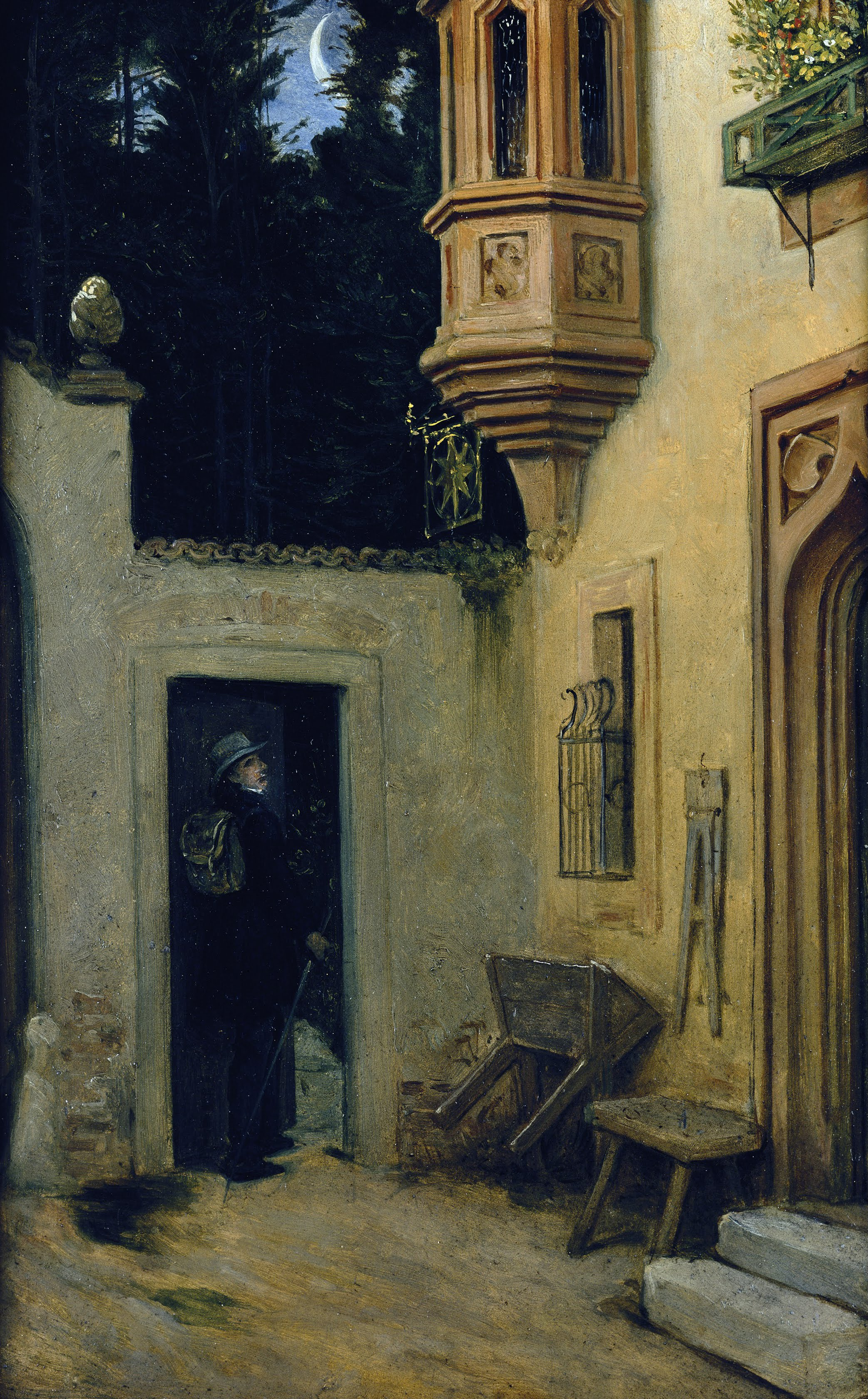
Farewell at Dawn (1859)

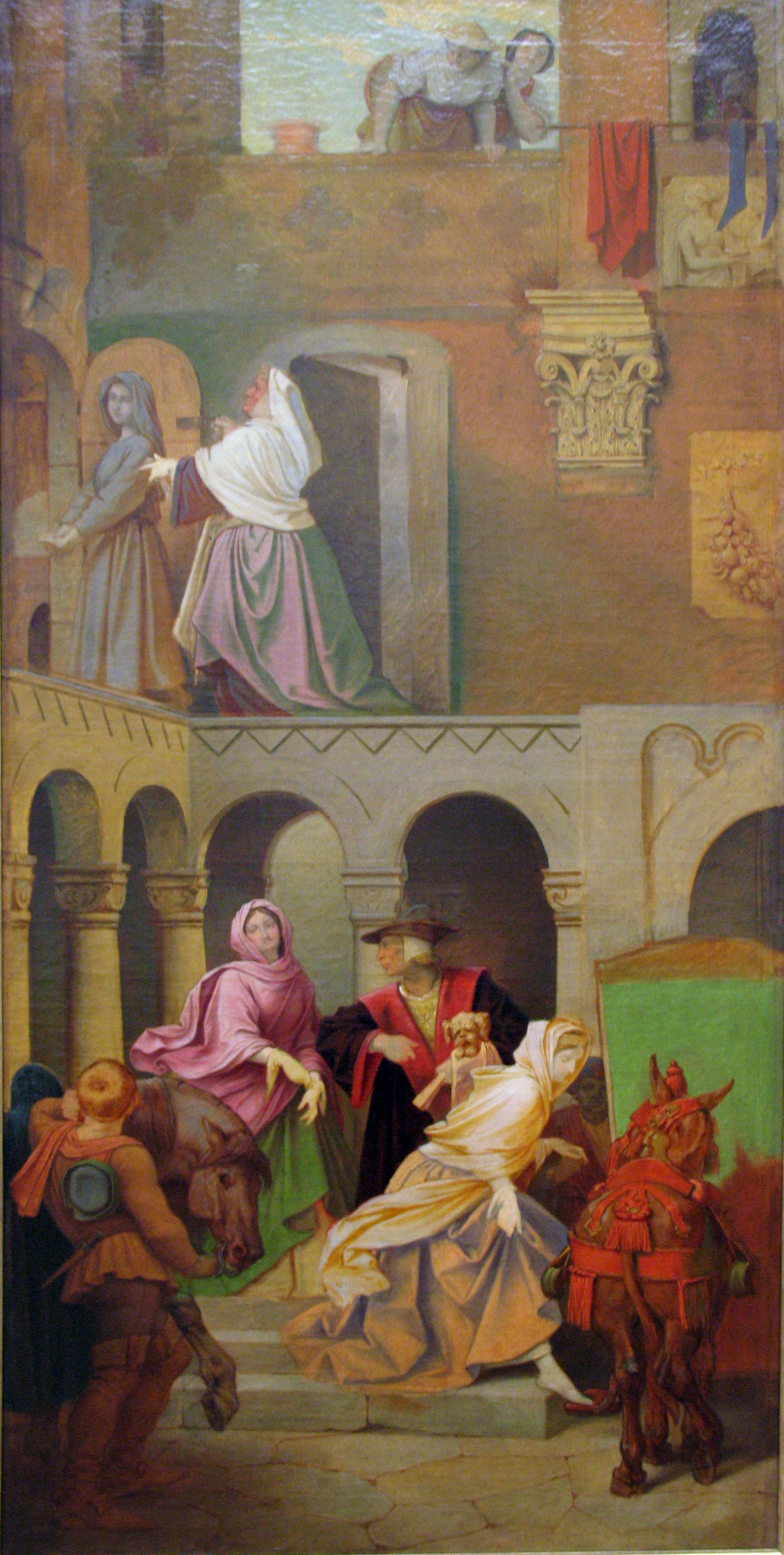
Cinderella, to go on the ball (1852)

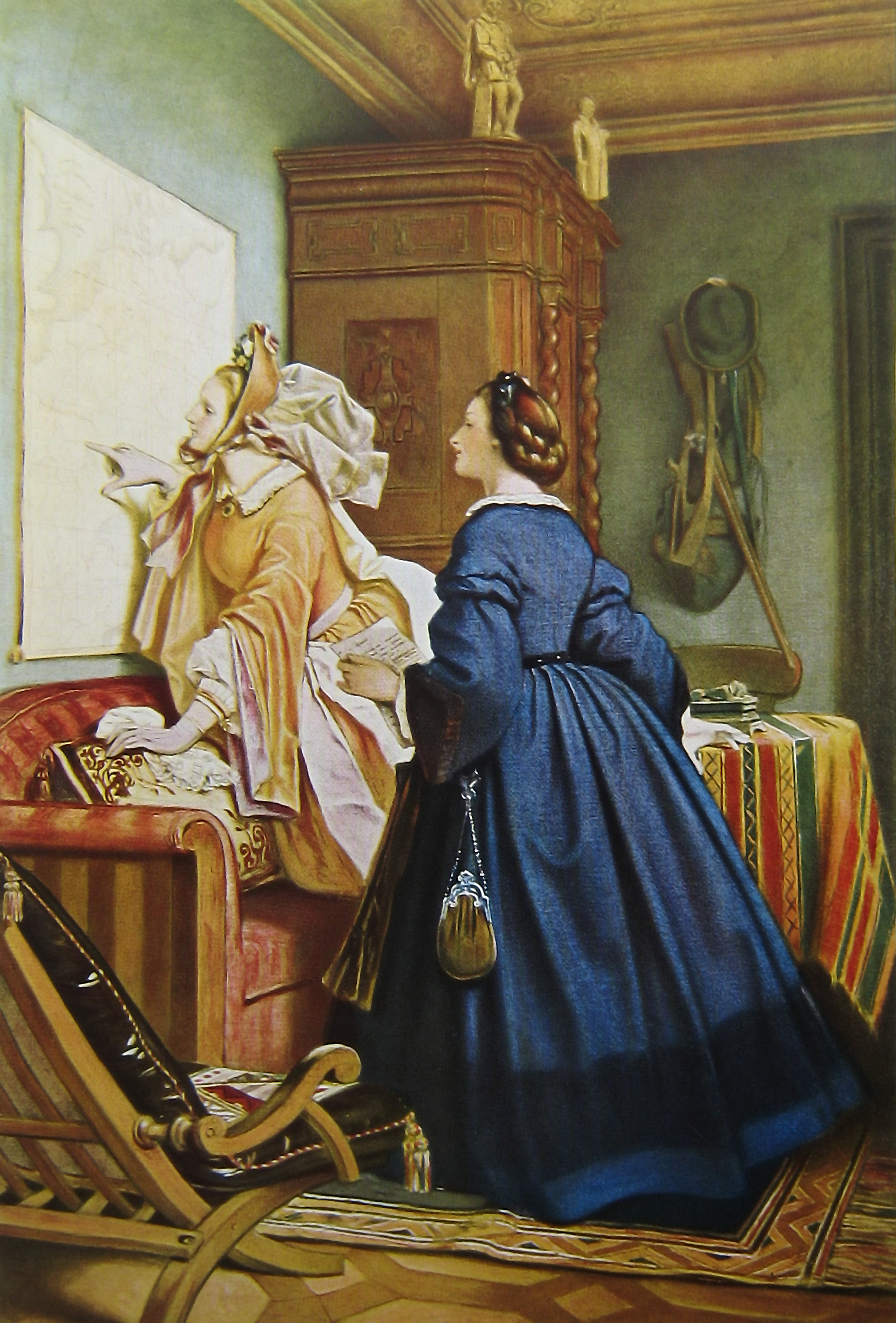
The Visit (1860)

== See also ==
- Romanticism
- Peter von Cornelius
- Johann Wolfgang von Goethe
