= Stumpf =

Stumpf or Stumpff is a surname. Notable people with the surname include:

- Bill Stumpf (1936–2006), American furniture designer
- Bill Stumpf (baseball) (1892–1966), American baseball player
- Carl Stumpf (1848–1936), German philosopher and psychologist
- Christian Stumpf (born 1966), Austrian football player
- Daniel Stumpf (born 1991), American baseball player
- Daniela Stumpf (born 1965), German football player
- Eddie Stumpf (1894–1978), American baseball player, manager and executive
- Georg Stumpf (born 1972), Austrian entrepreneur
- George Stumpf (1910–1993), American baseball player
- Hans-Jürgen Stumpff (1889-1968), German general
- Horst Stumpff (1887–1958), German general in World War II
- Hulda Stumpf (1867–1930), American Christian missionary in Kenya
- István Stumpf (born 1957), Hungarian politician
- Johann Andreas Stumpff (1769–1846), German maker of harps and pianos, resident in London
- Johann Stumpf (engineer), German steam locomotive engineer
- John Stumpf (born 1953), American businessman and banker
- Karl Stumpff (1895–1970), German astronomer
- Kenneth E. Stumpf (1944–2022), American soldier and Medal of Honor recipient
- Peter Stumpf (disambiguation), several people
- Tommi Stumpff (1958–2023), German musician
- Werner Stumpf (1917-1942) German Luftwaffe ace
- Wilhelm Stumpf (1873–1926), German painter and illustrator

== See also ==
- Stumpf Field at McMinn Park, Pennsylvania, United States
- 3105 Stumpff, a minor planet
- Stumph, a surname
