= Wilhelm Achtermann =

German sculptor (1799–1884)

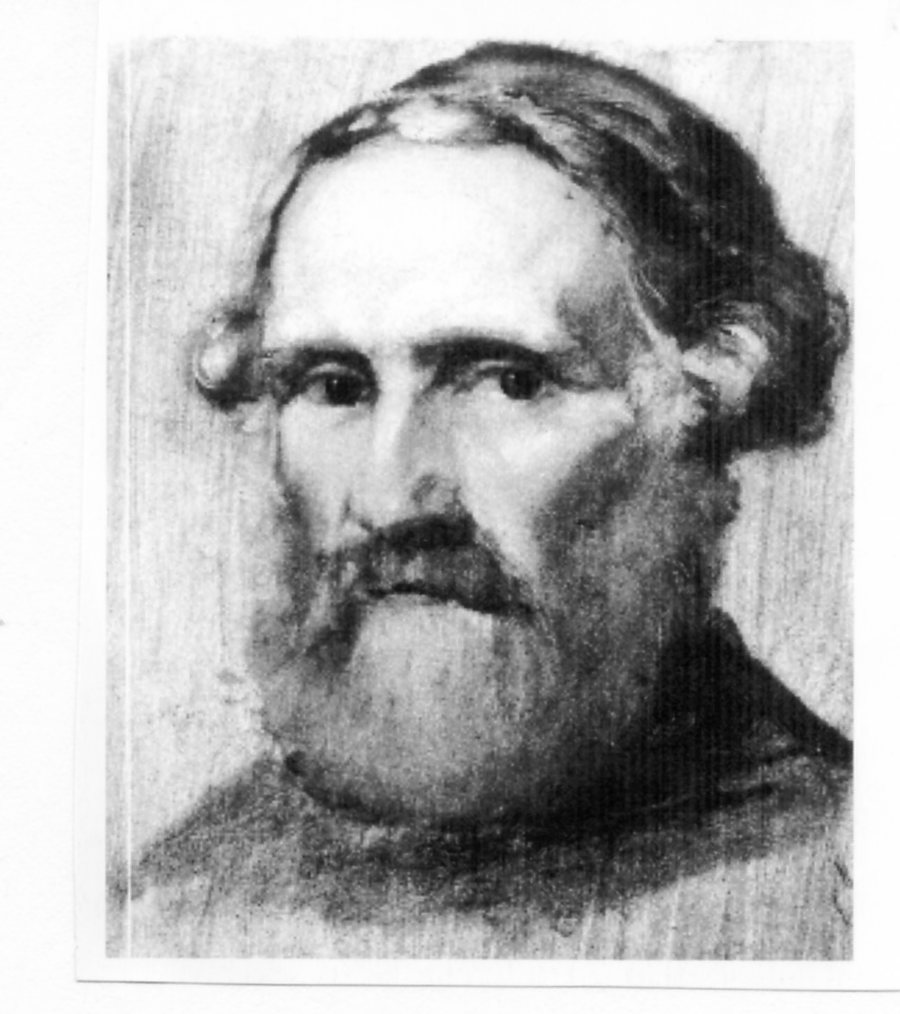
Wilhelm Achtermann

Wilhelm Theodor Achtermann (August 15, 1799 – May 26, 1884) was a German sculptor.

Born in Münster, he initially worked on a farm before becoming a cabinetmaker. His carving was so clever and graceful that it attracted attention, and procured him the good will of some art patrons, who sent him to Berlin in 1831. There he studied under the direction of Christian Daniel Rauch, Tieck, and Johann Gottfried Schadow, then the foremost sculptors of Germany.

Achtermann, however, being of a profoundly religious character, was drawn irresistibly to Rome, where he arrived in 1839 and remained until the end of his life. The first prominent product of his Roman studies was a Pietà which was secured for the Cathedral of Münster and which has often been copied. In 1858 the same cathedral acquired a group of seven life-size figures representing the descent from the Cross which is regarded as one of its chief art treasures. His last great work, finished when the artist had passed his seventieth year, was a Gothic altar triptych representing scenes from the life of Jesus. This was set up in the cathedral at Prague in the year 1873. He died in Rome in 1889. Achtermann's art is characterized by deep religious feeling and great imaginative power, although, on account of his having taken to an artistic career when somewhat advanced in life, he did not attain the technical mastery which he might otherwise have acquired.
