= Stumph =

Stumph is a surname of German origin, being an Americanized form of the German surname Stumpf, which originated as a topographic name for someone who lived on newly cleared land. Notable people with the surname include:

- Patrick Stumph (born 1984), better known as Patrick Stump, American musician, singer, and songwriter
- Stephanie Stumph (born 1984), German actress
- Wolfgang Stumph (born 1946), German actor and cabaret artist

== See also ==
- Stumpf
- Stump (surname)
