= Eduard von Heuss =

German painter and lithographer (1808–1880)

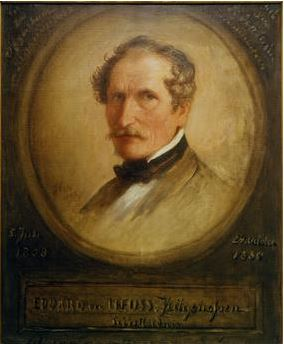
Eduard von Heuss (from a self-portrait)

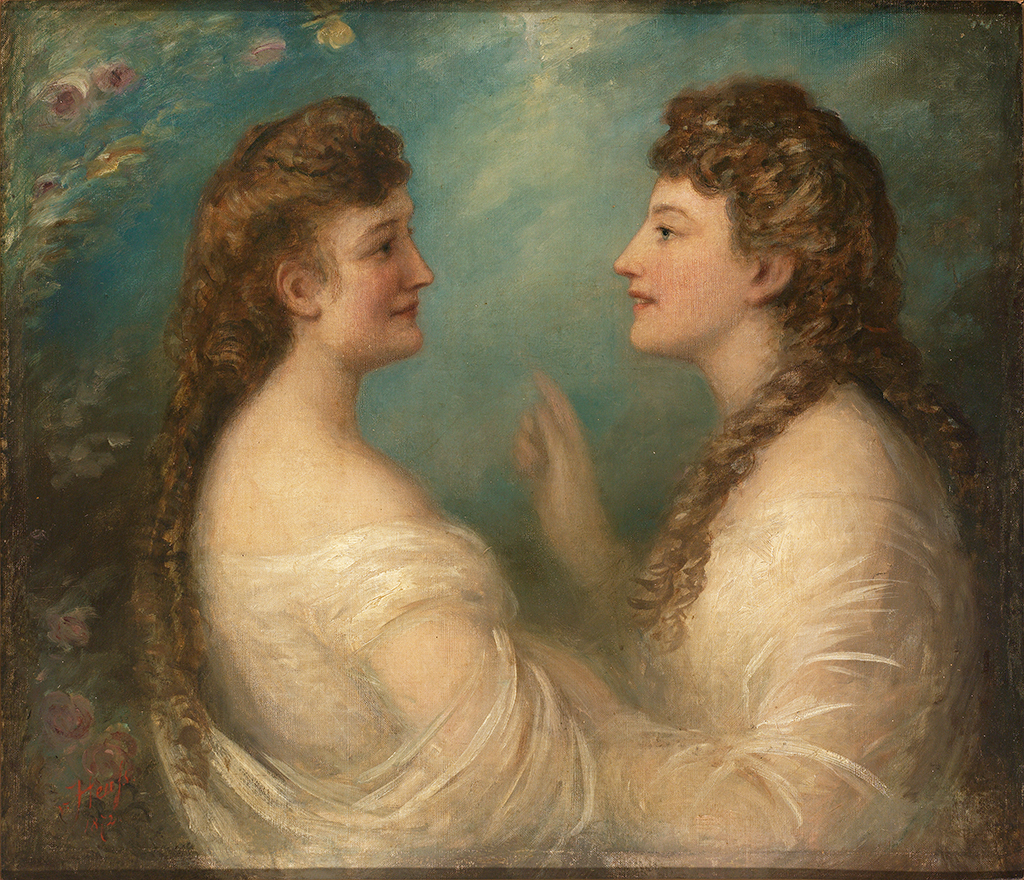
Portrait of his wife's sisters, Elisabeth and Sophie

Franz Eduard von Heuss (5 July 1808, Ludwigshafen – 24 October 1880, Bodenheim) was a German painter and lithographer.

== Life and work ==
His father, Peter Wilhelm Heuss (1759-1824), was a lawyer who practiced in Oggersheim, then in Mainz. It was there, at the age of thirteen, that Eduard began to learn drawing and lithography.

He continued his education at the Ludwig-Maximilians-Universität München where, following his mother's wishes, he studied medicine. He continued to learn to paint in his spare time, with August Riedel, a recent graduate of the Academy of Fine Arts. After obtaining his degree, he worked as a prosector with the physiologist, Ignaz Döllinger, to create anatomical drawings, but was prepared to switch to an artistic career, if possible. When Count Maximilian von Montgelas commissioned him to create a life-sized portrait lithograph, that attracted the attention of Grand Duke Louis II, who became a patron.

In 1831, the Grand Duke financed a study trip to Rome. He stayed there until 1835, mingling with the German artistic community and working as a painter of what have been described as "rather dull" portraits. In 1837, he continued his travels through Southern France and Switzerland. That same year, he married Amalie Barbara Kraetzer (1814-1853), daughter of the merchant and city councilor, Jakob Kraetzer (1773-1846). They had two sons and a daughter.

He mostly divided his time between Mainz, Rome and Paris; holding exhibitions at the Salon from 1846 to 1848. After Amalie's death, he led a restless life, travelling to virtually any place where his services were requested. In 1863, he was appointed Court Painter for the Grand Duchy of Hesse and settled in Bodenheim. In addition to a prolific outpouring of portraits, he created numerous religious works; notably, a portrait of Christ at Mainz Cathedral. In 1875, he chose to retire and returned to Rome for a lengthy stay.

Shortly before his death, he was awarded the Order of Saint Michael. A street in Bodenheim is named after him.

== Sources ==
- Hyacinth Holland (1905). "Heuß, Eduard von" . Allgemeine Deutsche Biographie (in German). Vol. 50. Leipzig: Duncker & Humblot. pp. 293–296.
- Willi Tatge: "Franz Eduard von Heuss – eine familien- und heimatgeschichtliche Darstellung". In: Pfälzisch-Rheinische Familienkunde Vol. VIII, 1974–1977, pp. 233–236.
- Karl Kreuter: "Eduard von Heuss. Ein Maler aus Oggersheim (1803–1880)". In: Pfälzisches Museum #48, 1931, pp. 157–161.
- Clemens Jöckle: "Franz Eduard von Heuß. Thorvaldsen in seiner Werkstatt". In: Landkreis Ludwigshafen. Heimat-Jahrbuch #8, 1992, pp. 85–87 ISSN 1860-3378.
