= Adam Eberle =

German painter

Adam Eberle (27 March 1804 – 15 April 1832), one of the earliest and most gifted pupils of Peter von Cornelius, was born at Aachen. He studied painting at the Düsseldorf Academy, and afterwards went with Cornelius to Munich. After commencing his career at Düsseldorf by painting The Entombment of Christ and St. Helena with two Angels he executed the large fresco-painting on the ceiling of the Odéon, representing Apollo among the Shepherds. In 1829 he went to Rome, where he died in 1832. He is associated with the Düsseldorf school of painting.

== See also ==
- List of German painters
