= Peter von Cornelius =

German painter (1783–1867)

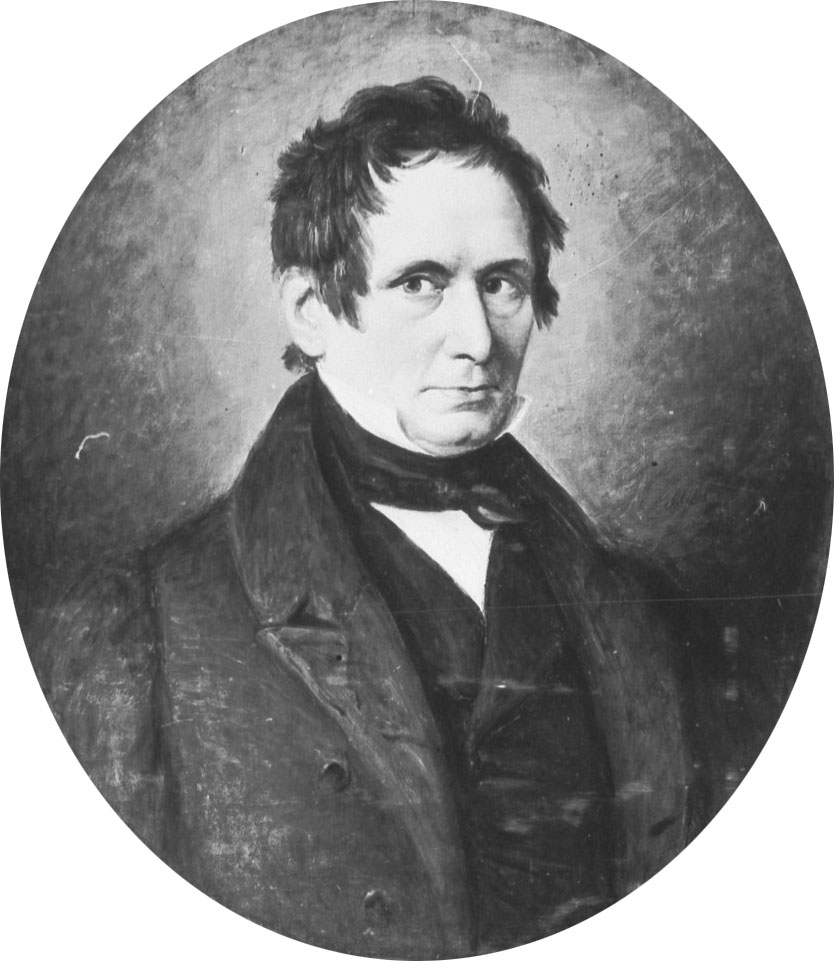
Peter von Cornelius; by Eduard von Heuss

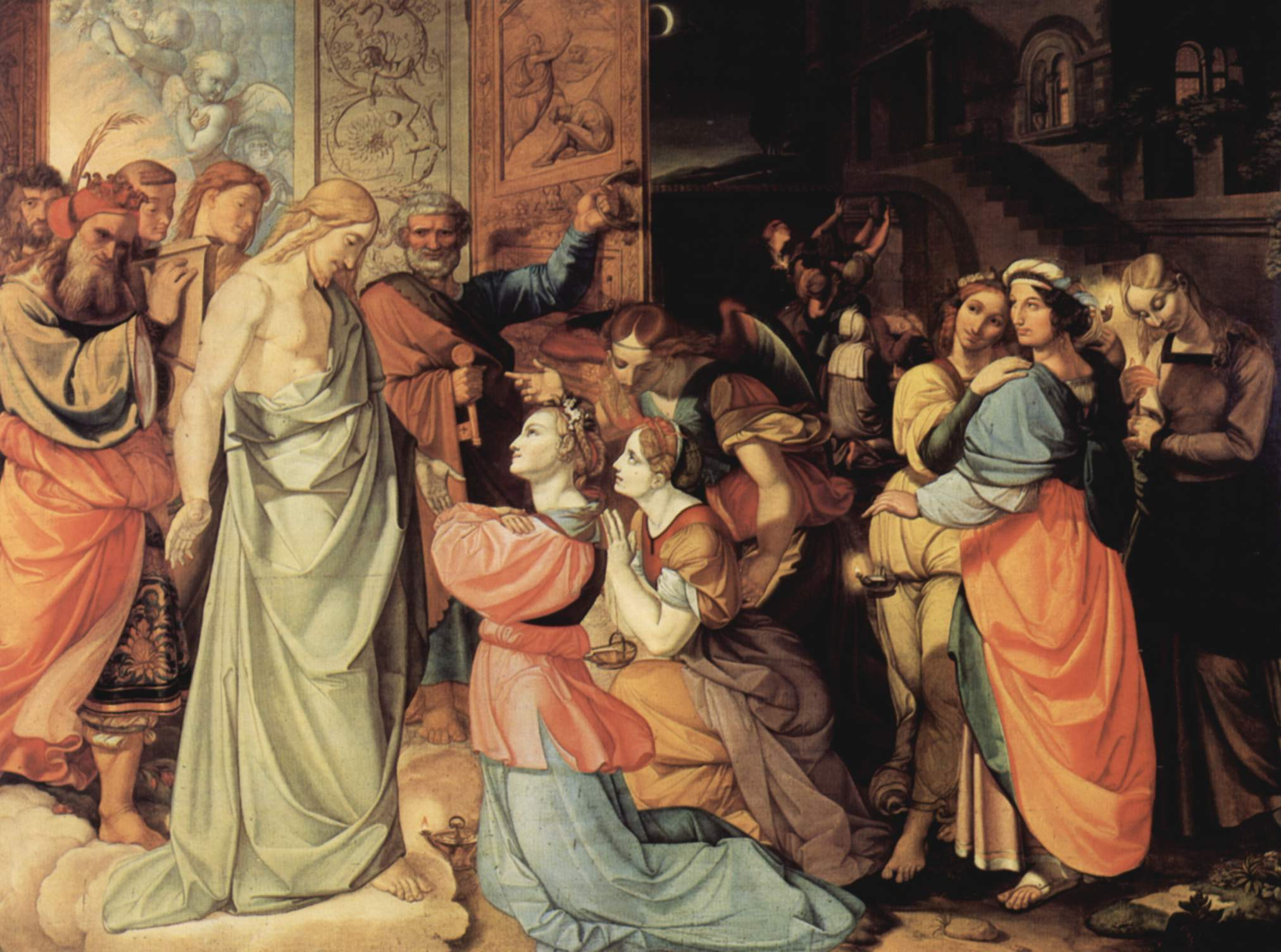
The Wise & Foolish Virgins, c. 1813

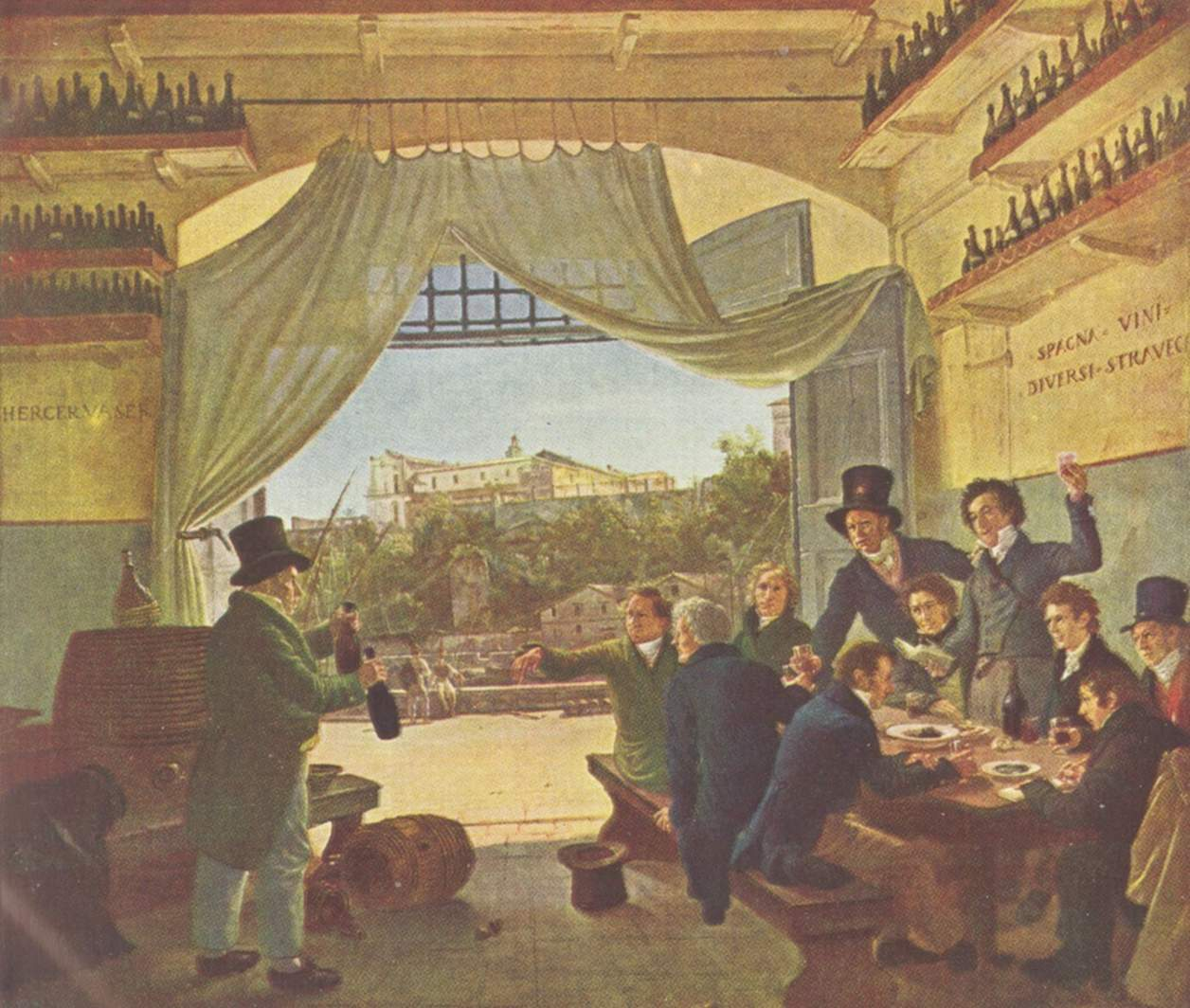
Tavern Scene, circa 1820, National Museum in Wrocław

Peter von Cornelius (23 September 1783, Düsseldorf – 6 March 1867, Berlin) was a German painter and one of the main representatives of the Nazarene movement. He was the uncle of the composer Peter Cornelius (1824–1874).

== Life ==
=== Early years ===
Cornelius was born in Düsseldorf. From the age of twelve he attended drawing classes at the Düsseldorf Academy. His father, who was superintendent of the Düsseldorf gallery and professor at the academy, died in 1799, after which Cornelius supported his family by his work as a portraitist and illustrator. In a letter to the Count Raczynski he wrote:

It fell to the lot of an elder brother and myself to watch over the interests of a numerous family. It was at this time that it was attempted to persuade my mother that it would be better for me to devote myself to the trade of a goldsmith than to continue to pursue painting – in the first place, in consequence of the time necessary to qualify me for the art, and in the next, because there were already so many painters. My dear mother, however, rejected all this advice, and I felt myself impelled onward by an uncontrollable enthusiasm, to which the confidence of my mother gave new strength, which was supported by the continual fear that I should be removed from the study of that art I loved so much.

His earliest major work was the decoration of the choir of the church of St Quirinus at Neuss, commissioned by Canon Wallraff of Cologne in 1803. In 1809, he began a series of drawings illustrating Goethe's Faust, the first part of which had been published the previous year. For these Cornelius employed a linear style much influenced by a facsimile edition of Dürer's prayer book for Maximilian I. Six of the images were shown to the poet, who approved of them. Cornelius continued the series following his move to Rome, and it was published in twelve engravings between 1816 and 1826, under the title Bilder zu Goethe's Faust. He moved to Frankfurt in 1809, and worked there until going to Rome two years later.

=== Rome ===
Cornelius arrived in Rome on 14 October 1811, and soon became one of the most promising of the Lukasbund or "Nazarene Brotherhood", a group of young German artists resident in the city, which included Johann Friedrich Overbeck, Friedrich Wilhelm Schadow, Philipp Veit, Julius Schnorr von Karolsfeld and Ludwig Vogel, a fraternity (some of whom selected a ruinous convent for their home) who had banded together for resolute study and mutual criticism. At Rome Cornelius participated, with other members of the brotherhood, in the decoration of the Casa Zuccari (the residence of Jakob Salomon Bartholdy, the Prussian consul general), and the Villa Massimi, while at the same time also working on designs for the illustration of the Nibelungenlied.

=== Return to Germany ===
In 1819, Cornelius left the frescoes at the Villa Massimi unfinished and returned to Germany, having been summoned to Munich by the crown-prince of Bavaria, later King Ludwig I, to direct the decorations for his new sculpture gallery, the Glyptothek. In 1821, he took on, in addition to his work for Ludwig, the directorship of the Düsseldorf Academy. He soon discovered, however, that attention to such widely separated duties was incompatible with the just performance of either, and so eventually he resigned his post at Düsseldorf, some of his pupils following him to Munich to assist him there. At the death of Director Langer, 1824–5, he became director of the Munich Academy.

=== Works in Munich and Berlin ===
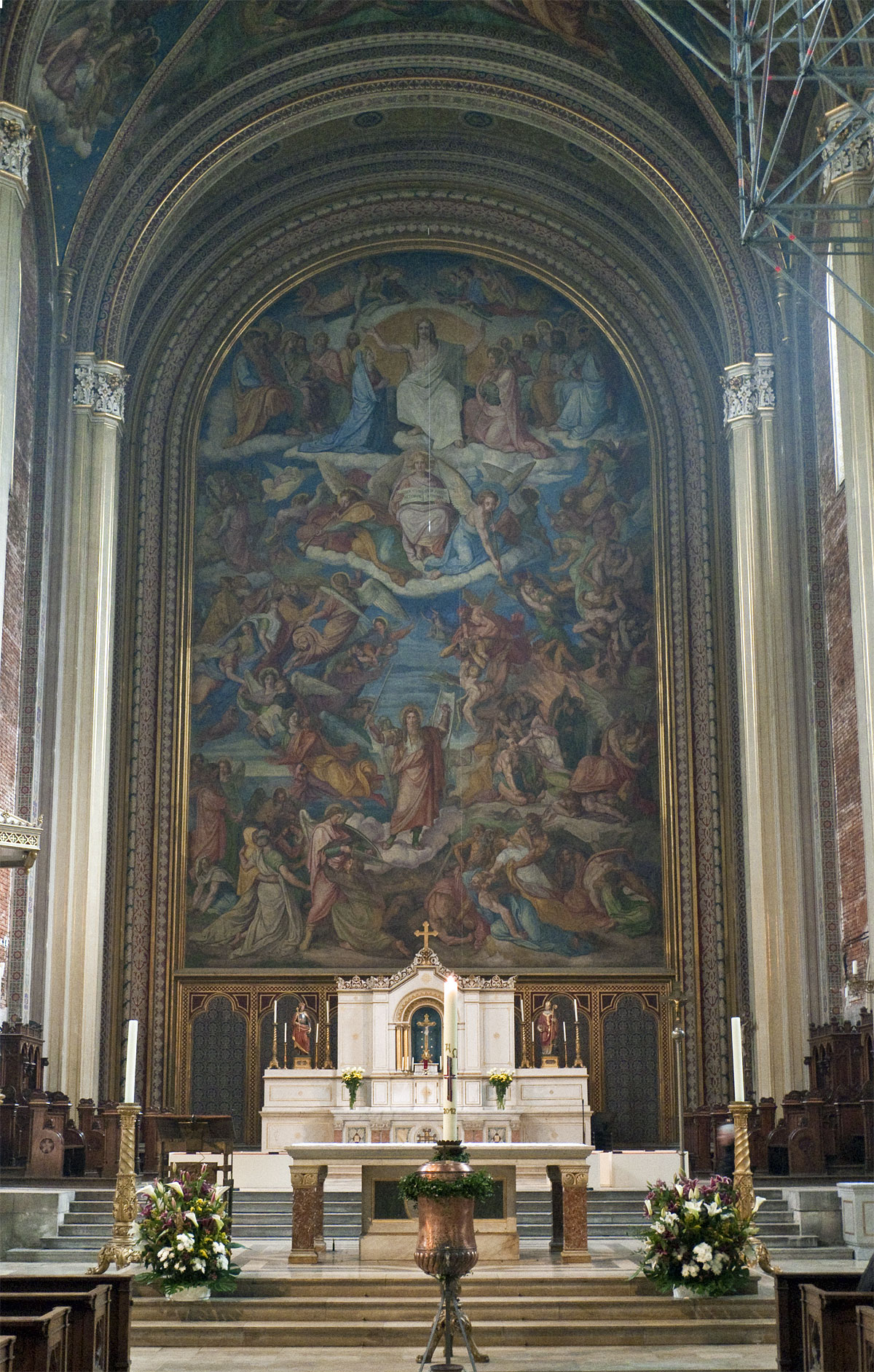
Fresco of The Last Judgment at the Ludwigskirche in Munich

The fresco decorations of the Ludwigskirche in Munich, which were for the most part designed and executed by Cornelius, were perhaps the most important mural works of their time. The large fresco of the Last Judgment, over the high altar in that church, measures 62 feet (19 m) in height by 38 feet (12 m) in width. The frescoes of the Creator, the Nativity, and the Crucifixion in the same building are also upon a large scale. Other major works in Munich included his decorations in the Pinakothek and in the Glyptothek; those in the latter building, in the hall of the gods and the hall of the hero-myths, are perhaps the best known. In about 1839–40, he left Munich for Berlin to work on a series of cartoons, depicting the Apocalypse, for a cycle of frescoes commissioned by Frederick William IV for a proposed "Campo Santo" or royal mausoleum in Berlin. The king abandoned his plans following the revolution of 1848, but Cornelius continued to work on the cartoons for the rest of his life.

He maintained close contact with the art world in Rome, and returned to live there between 1853 and 1869.

== Style and technique ==
Cornelius, as an oil painter, possessed little technical skill, and his works do not exhibit any instinctive appreciation of colour. Even as a fresco painter his manipulative power was not great. In critically examining the execution in colour of some of his magnificent designs, one cannot help feeling that he was, in this respect, unable to do them full justice. Cornelius and his associates endeavoured to follow in their works the spirit of the Italian painters. But the Italian strain is to a considerable extent modified by the Dürer heritage. This Dürer influence is manifest in a tendency to overcrowding in composition, in a degree of attenuation in the proportions of, and a poverty of contour in, the nude figure, and also in a leaning to the selection of Gothic forms for draperies. These peculiarities are even noticeable in Cornelius's principal work of the "Last Judgment", in the Ludwigskirche in Munich.

The attenuation and want of flexibility of contour in the nude are perhaps most conspicuous in his frescoes of classical subjects in the Glyptothek, especially in that representing the contention for the body of Patroclus. But despite these peculiarities there is always in his works a grandeur and nobility of conception. Although not dexterous in the handling of the brush, he could conceive and design a subject with masterly purpose. If he had an imperfect eye for colour, he had vast mental foresight in directing the German school of painting; and his favorite motto of "Deutschland uber alles" indicates the direction and the strength of his patriotism. His pupils included Karl Hermann, Wilhelm von Kaulbach and Adam Eberle. Cornelius often relied on pupils and assistants for the execution, and sometimes even the design of the projects of which he was in charge. The cartoons for the Glyptothek were all by Cornelius's own hand; in the Pinakothek, however, his sketches and small drawings sufficed, and at the Ludwigskirche even the invention of some of the subjects was entrusted to Hermann.

== Influence ==
In 1855, Théophile Gautier wrote that Cornelius "enjoyed a celebrity such as few artists enjoy in their lifetime", adding that he was admired "as if he were already dead". To comprehend and appreciate thoroughly the magnitude of the work which Cornelius accomplished for Germany, we must remember that at the beginning of the 19th century Germany had no national school of art. Germany was in painting and sculpture behind all the rest of Europe. Yet in less than half a century Cornelius founded a great school, revived mural painting, and turned the gaze of the art world towards Munich. The German revival of mural painting had its effect upon England, as well as upon other European nations, and led to the famous cartoon competitions held in Westminster Hall, and ultimately to the partial decoration of the Houses of Parliament. In November 1841, when the latter work was in contemplation, Cornelius, in response to invitations, visited England. His opinion was in every way favourable to the carrying out of the project, and even in respect of the durability of fresco in the English climate.

Cornelius, in his teaching, always inculcated a close and rigorous study of nature, but he understood by the study of nature something more than constantly making studies from life; he meant the study of nature with an inquiring and scientific spirit. Study nature, was the advice he once gave, in order that you may become acquainted with its essential forms.

== See also ==
- List of German painters
