= Heinrich von Zügel =

German painter

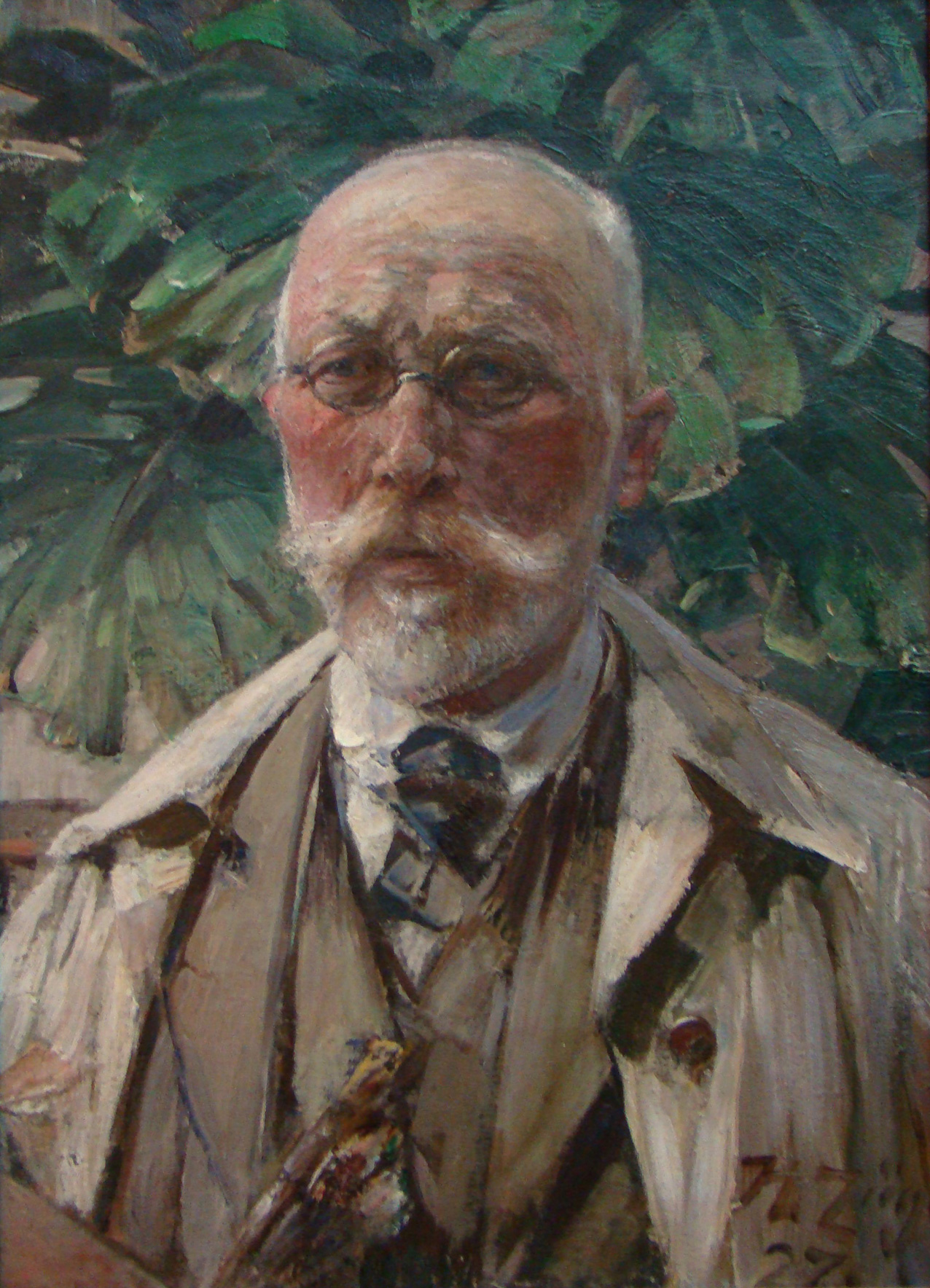
Self-portrait (1927)

Heinrich Johann von Zügel (22 October 1850, Murrhardt – 30 January 1941, Munich) was a German painter who specialized in pictures of farm and domestic animals, often posed with a human in a dramatic or humorous situation.

== Life ==
Beginning in 1867, Zügel was a student at the art school in Stuttgart under Bernhard von Neher and Heinrich von Rustige, where he studied animal and genre painting. Two years later, he transferred to the Academy of Fine Arts Munich, but was not inspired by the teaching methods of Karl von Piloty and decided to work independently. Afterwards, he spent some time in Vienna and finally settled in Munich. Anton Braith became an important mentor for him there.

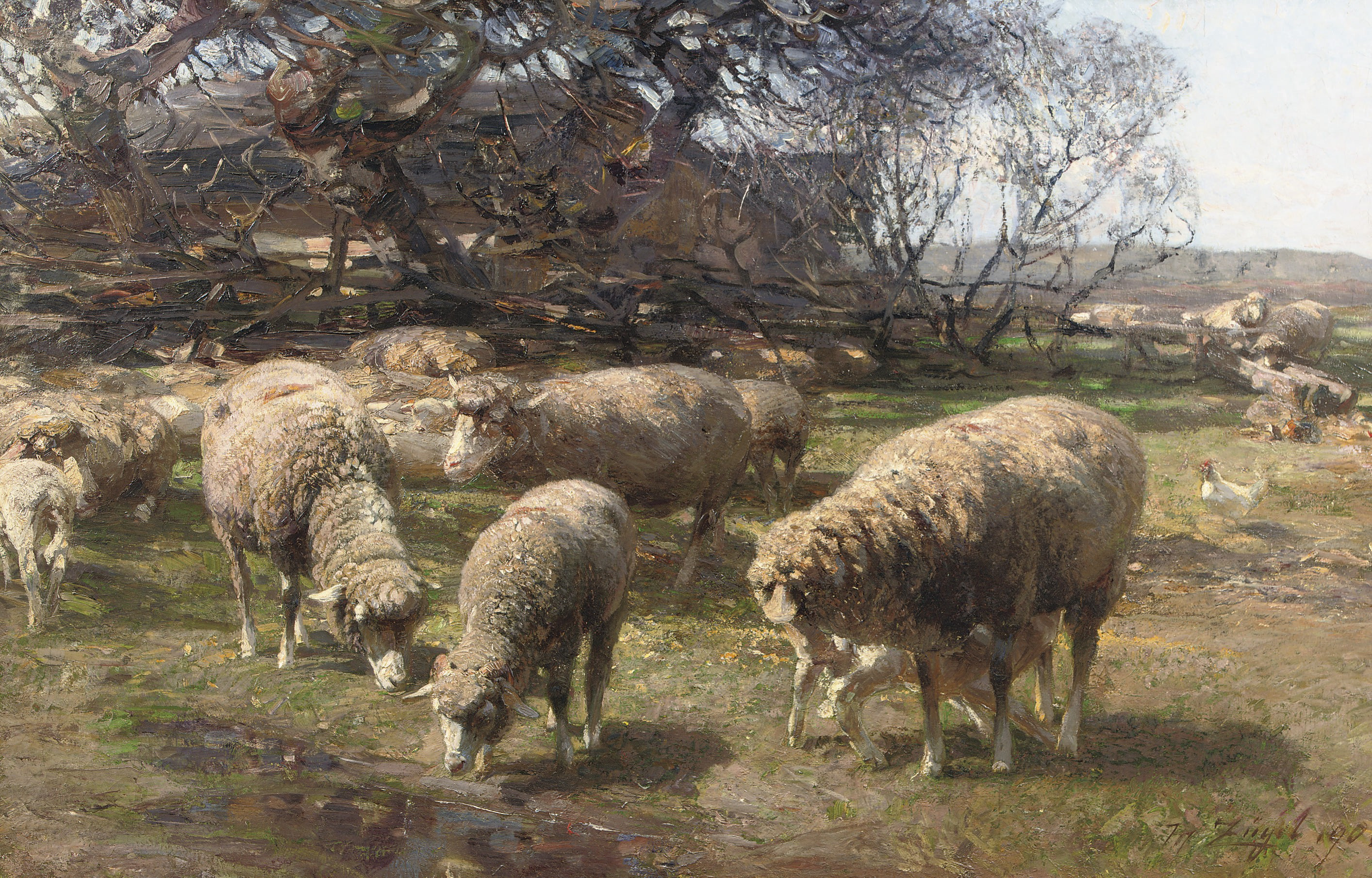
A Sunny March Morning

In the early 1880s, he was attracted to the rural scenery in the Dachau District and began to paint outdoors, placing his subjects in a broader landscape setting. Studies undertaken along the Dutch and Belgian coastline in the early 1890s confirmed his attraction to Impressionism, which he had encountered at exhibitions in Paris. From that point on, atmospheric reflections and the play of light and shadow were his primary concerns, while details were subordinated. This led him to become one of the founding members of the Munich Secession.

He spent over forty years on a theme he called "Heavy Work" (mostly portrayals of horses and oxen plowing) and produced over 24 canvases, which give a detailed picture of his artistic development. He continued to paint in a light, impressionistic style until he was in his eighties.

In 1895, he became a Professor at the Academy of Fine Arts Munich, a position he retained until his retirement in 1922. Christian Schad, Maximilian Liebenwein and Wilhelm Stumpf were among his best-known students. One of his last 'Meisterschüler" was Heinz Theis (1894–1966).

In Wörth am Rhein, there is a Memorial Gallery dedicated to his works at the Old City Hall. He spent many summers there, on vacation or with his students. The city benefitted greatly from the modelling fees and the rentals he paid to use their animals, as well as the money his students spent on food and lodging. His works are also on display at the National Gallery (Berlin).

== Major works ==
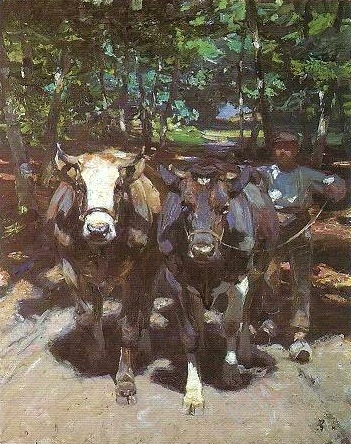
Through the Forest, c.1911

- "Das Ochsengespann" (The Ox Team), "Self-portrait" and "View of Murrhardt"" (Municipal Gallery, Murrhardt)
- "Die vor dem Gewitter flüchtende Herde" (Herd Fleeing Before the Storm)
- "Schafe im Erlenhain" (Sheep in the Aldergrove, National Gallery (Berlin))
- "Ochsen am Pflug" (Oxen to the Plow, Old City Hall, Wörth am Rhein)
- "Frühlingssonne und Herbstsonne" (Spring and Autumn Sunshine)

== Sources and further reading ==
- Der Tiermaler Heinrich v. Zügel 90 Jahre alt. In: Schwaben, Monatshefte für Volkstum und Kultur, Jg. 1940, Heft 9/10, S. 441–448
- Wilhelm Steigelmann (Ed.): Heinrich von Zügel und die Wörther Malerschule. Kaußler, Landau o. J. (1957)
- Eugen Diem: Heinrich von Zügel, Leben. Schaffen. Werk (Werkverzeichnis), Verlag Aurel Bongers Recklinghausen 1975, ISBN 3-7647-0277-X
- Eugen Diem: Heinrich von Zügel und seine Zeit (u.a. Ergänzung des Werkverzeichnisses), Verlag Aurel Bongers Recklinghausen 1986, ISBN 3-7647-0378-4
- Beate Menke; Christian Unger (Illustrator) (1991), Heinrich von Zügel, Zum 50. Todesjahr (in German), Recklinghausen: Bongers, ISBN 3-7647-0424-1
- Elisabeth Feilen: Heinrich von Zügel und das Malerdorf Wörth am Rhein (1894-1920), Saarbrücken 1993 (Dissertation)
- Clemens Jöckle (2001), Mit der Farbe zeichnen, Heinrich von Zügel (1850–1941) (in German), Kunstverlag Josef Fink, ISBN 3-933784-63-8
- Elisabeth Feilen: Länderporträt Bayern, Heinrich von Zügel, in Arsprototo, Ausgabe 1-2011,
- Ingrid Helber, Heide von Berlepsch: Schwäbischer Impressionismus im Umfeld von Heinrich von Zügel. Stadt Murrhardt 2011, ISBN 978-3-943069-00-6
