= Wilhelm Stumpf =

German painter

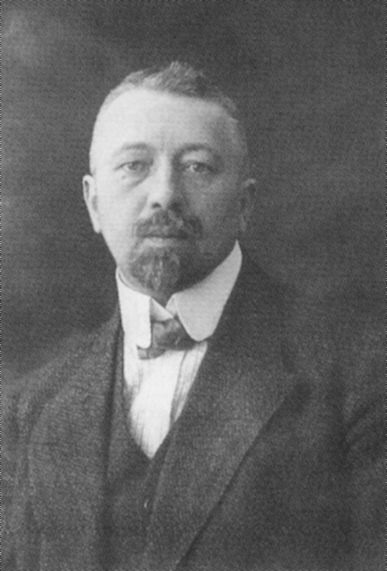
Wilhelm Stumpf (c.1910)

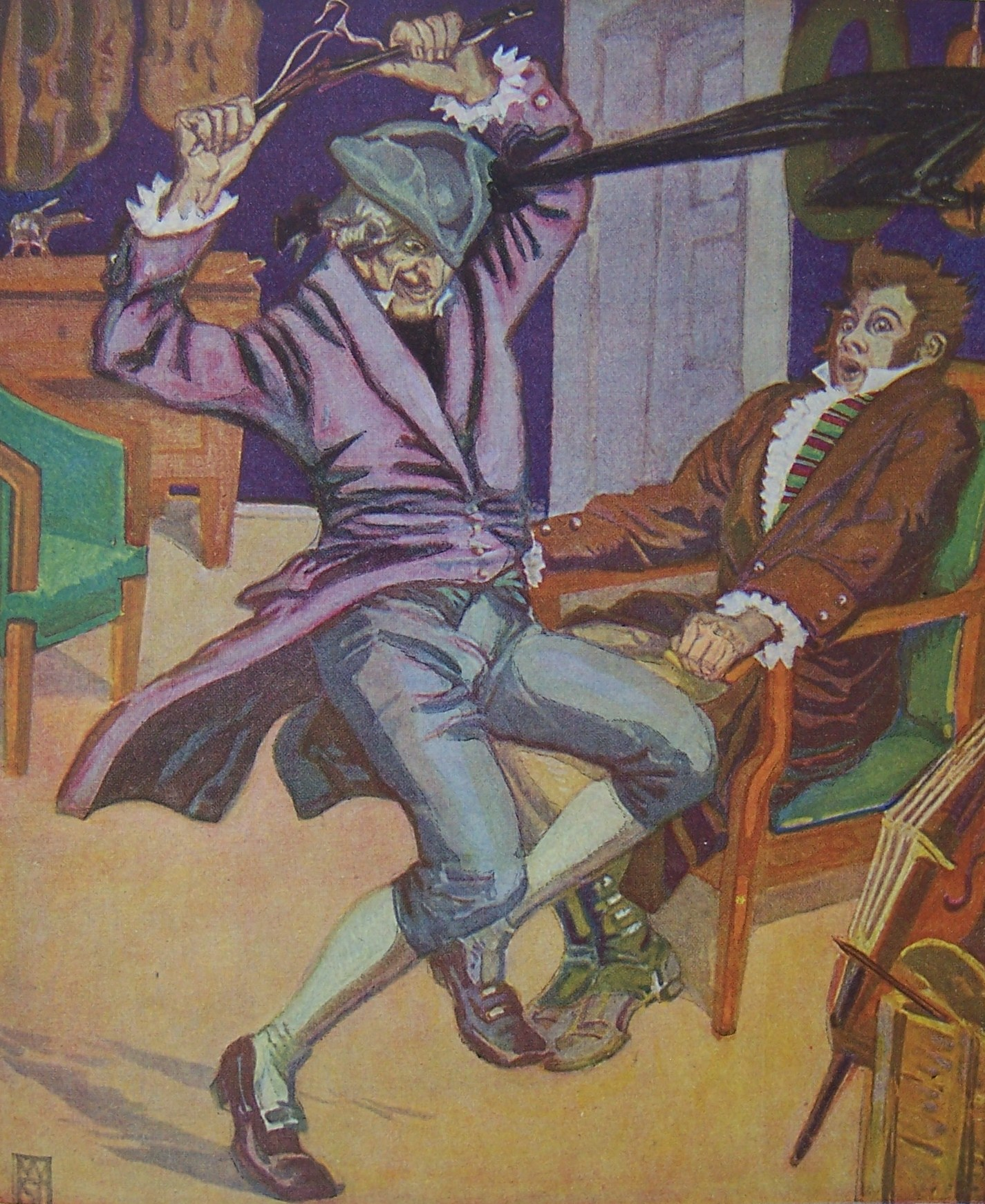
Illustration for the Tales of E. T. A. Hoffmann

Wilhelm Ludwig Ferdinand Stumpf (30 March 1873, in Weimar – 27 August 1926, in Oberstaufen) was a German landscape/portrait painter and illustrator.

== Life ==
He was the son of a businessman, Gustav Stumpf (1842–1914). From 1884 to 1889, he attended the König-Albert-Gymnasium in Leipzig. Later he attended the art academies in Leipzig and Munich, where he specialized in landscape and portrait painting. In Munich he studied under Gabriel von Hackl, Karl Raupp, Paul Hoecker and Heinrich von Zügel. His style of painting was, therefore, highly influenced by Impressionism. From 1898 to 1899 he attended the art school at Burghausen.

In 1904 he married Gertrud Salge (1877–1949), a painter from Magdeburg. They lived in Wolfratshausen at first then, from 1908 to 1910, in Regenstauf. From 1900 to 1922 he exhibited regularly at the Munich Glaspalast. In that year, he won the Silver Medal for decorative design at the Leipzig Art Exhibition. In addition to his paintings, he produced woodcuts, etchings and book illustrations.

During the First World War, he served as a war correspondent and illustrator for the German campaign in the Vosges. This was not only physically stressful, but psychologically damaging as well. After the war, Stumpf and his wife moved to the Oberallgäu district, settling in Oberstaufen, where he stayed at a rehabilitation center, hoping to recuperate his strength and peace of mind. Unfortunately, the hyperinflation of the 1920s wiped out his savings and he was in little demand as an artist. As a result, he fell into a deep depression and committed suicide.

In 2009, a memorial exhibition was presented in Oberstaufen, accompanied by the first comprehensive catalog of his works; a list of which can be found in the corresponding article on German Wikipedia.

== Sources ==
- Ingrid Huober, Monika Gauss, Anne Marie Mörler: Wilhelm Stumpf 1873-1926. Gedächtnisausstellung im Färberhaus Oberstaufen 2009. herausgegeben vom Künstlerkreis Oberstaufen, Oberstaufen 2009.
- Gunther le Maire: Ein Weimarer hofft auf Heilung im Allgäu. Kunstgeschichte(n) 49: Wilhelm Stumpf. In: Allgäuer Anzeigenblatt. Oberallgäu-Kultur, Nr. 70, 24 March 2007. (online)
- Rosemarie Schwesinger: Das tragische Ende eines Heilung-Suchenden. In: Allgäuer-Anzeigenblatt. Oberallgäu-Kultur, Nr. 219 23 September 2009. (online)
