= Peter Stumpf =

Peter Stumpf may refer to:

- Peter Stumpp (d. 1589) or Peter Stumpf, tried as a werewolf in 1589
- Peter Stumpf (cellist), principal cello of the Los Angeles Philharmonic orchestra
- Peter P. Stumpf Jr. (1948–2010), American politician and businessman
- Peter Štumpf (born 1962), Slovenian Roman Catholic prelate
- Péter Stumpf, Hungarian politician
