= Clemens Jöckle =

German art historian

Clemens Jöckle (15 April 1950 – 2 June 2014) was a German art historian. From 2001 to 2012, he was the director of the Städtische Galerie Speyer.

== Life ==
Jöckle was born in Wasserlos. His career was bumpy at first.

== Director of the Municipal Gallery Speyer ==
In 2001, Jöckle was appointed sole director of the Städtische Galerie Speyer. After a long political discussion, the gallery had been established in a building complex belonging to the city of Speyer, next to the Altes Stadtsaal, which was used as a children's and youth theatre and alternative cinema. Both buildings, located behind the old town hall, together with the Zimmertheater Speyer and the Winkeldruckerey, which were also located there, formed the so-called Kulturhof Speyer. The Städtische Galerie was run with professional opening hours, whereas many municipal galleries only opened by the day and then by the hour, and achieved maximum closing times of one week between exhibitions. Jöckle did not want a gallery with a bar; the focus was not to be on the encounter with the wine glass, but with art. Between its opening on 23 July 2001 and 2012, the gallery hosted almost a hundred exhibitions, including paintings by painters such as Marc Chagall, Henri Matisse and Antonio Saura as well as great Palatine painters such as Hans Purrmann, Anselm Feuerbach and Max Slevogt. After the fall of the Wall, Jöckle organised the first western exhibition of the young New Leipzig School. The gallery's basic programme consisted of a variety of thematic exhibitions, best-of exhibitions by young artists, anniversary exhibitions and, time and again, the presentation of otherwise inaccessible private collections.

== Planned Wittelsbach Exhibition and death ==
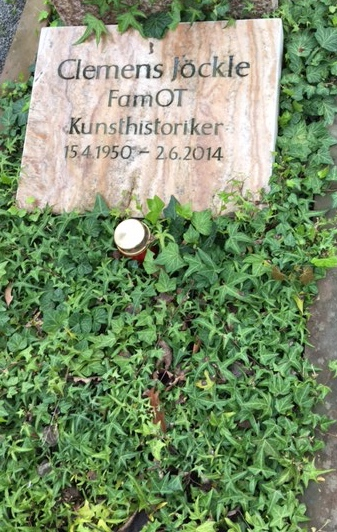
Grab von Clemens Jöckle auf dem Friedhof Speyer

In July 2012, he was appointed by the Mainz Ministry of Culture to prepare the planned large Wittelsbach exhibition at Villa Ludwigshöhe Palace from the beginning of 2013. This did not happen due to a severe stroke in autumn 2012, as a result of which he died on 2 June 2014 at the age of 64.

Jöckle's grave is located in the Speyer cemetery. The designation FamOT on the gravestone means that Clemens Jöckle was a lay member of the Teutonic Order (Ordo Teutonicus).

== Publications ==
- Friedrich Jossé – Bilder aus dem Leben einer Kleinstadt. Bezirksgruppe Speyer des Historischen Vereins der Pfalz 1978
- Kleine Chronik des Kunstvereins: Vom pfälzischen Kunstverein zum Kunstverein Speyer. Speyer 1980.
- Wallfahrtsstätten im Bistum Speyer. 1983, ISBN 3795404991
- Der Maler Friedrich Jossé. Leben und Werk. Schnell u. Steiner, Munich [among others] 1987
- with Ambrosius Schneider, Werner Seeling uad Peter Roth: Otterberg. Kirche, Konfessionen, Geschichte. Evangelischer Presseverlag Pfalz, 1993
- Werner Holz (1948–1991). Das Schiff des Lebens oder die Kunst, einen Vorhang zu lüften. In Ludwigshafen <Landkreis>: Heimatjahrbuch. Vol. 10, 1994, pp. 83–86
- Das große Heiligenlexikon. K. Müller Verlag, Erlangen 1995, ISBN 3860704389
- with Josef Matheis: Markus Klammer (1963–1993). Leben und Werk. Josef Fink Verlag, Lindenberg 1996, ISBN 3931820149
- Das Narrenschiff am Abgrund. Zur Bildmetaphorik von Werner Holz. "Labyrinthische Bilderwelten" / [Kunstverein Bad Dürkheim]. Bad Dürkheim 1998.
- Memento Mori. Friedhöfe Europas. GLB Parkland, 1998, ISBN 3880599394, übersetzt ins Tschechische von Jana Zoubková
- 100 Bauwerke in Frankfurt. Verlag Schnell und Steiner, Regensburg 1998, ISBN 3795411661
- Pilgerstätten. Hundert Wunderstätten Europas. K. Müller Verlag, Erlangen 1999, ISBN 3860704370
- Mit der Farbe zeichnen. Heinrich von Zügel (1850–1941). Kunstverlag Josef Fink, Lindenberg 2001, ISBN 3-933784-63-8 (also translated into Czech by Josef Matějů and into Dutch by Maarten Lekkerkerken).
- with Christopher Kerstjens von Fink: Mit Farbe und Linie. Elisabeth Mack-Usselmann. Kunstverlag Josef Fink, Lindenberg 2002, ISBN 3898700852
- with Heinz Setzer: Adolf Doerner (1892–1964). Leben und Werk. Kunstverlag Josef Fink, Lindenberg 2003, ISBN 3898701379
- with Christopher Kerstjens: Baustile der Weltarchitektur. Das Standardwerk der Baukunst von der Antike bis zur Gegenwart. 2006, von den Vorauflagen dieses Buches (Erstauflage 2001) existieren Übersetzungen so z.B. von Eszter Krisztina Aczél ins Ungarische oder ins Niederländische
- with Georg Denzler: Der Vatikan. Geschichte – Kunst – Bedeutung. Primus Verlag, Darmstadt 2006, ISBN 978-3-89678-573-2
- Der heilige Laurentius. Diakon und Märtyrer. Sadifa-Media, Kehl/Rhein 2008, ISBN 978-3-88786-365-4
- Der heilige Georg. Legende, Verehrung und Darstellungen. Der edle, leuchtende Stern aus Kappadozien. Sadifa-Media, Kehl/Rhein 2008, ISBN 978-3-88786-185-8
- Der Maler Georg Krajewski – Leben und Werk. Verlag Giloi & Ultes, Winnweiler 2010, ISBN 9783933778130
- Kloster St. Magdalena Speyer. Schnell-Kunstführer Nr. 1346, 1st edition, Munich 1983.
- with photos by Thomas Klenner, Horst Poggel: Dreifaltigkeitskirche Speyer. 5th edition, Schnell & Steiner, Regensburg 2011, ISBN 978-3-7954-4919-3
- in collaboration with Josef Staab: Kiedrich im Rheingau. 13th edition, Schnell & Steiner, Regensburg 2011, ISBN 978-3-7954-6036-5
- with Fotos von Renate J. Deckers-Matzko: St. Joseph, Speyer. 2nd edition, Schnell & Steiner, Regensburg 2011, ISBN 978-3-7954-6514-8
- Memento mori. berühmte Friedhöfe Europas. Nebel-Verlag, Utting 2011, ISBN 978-3-86862-010-8
