= Tieck =

Tieck may refer to:

- Christian Friedrich Tieck (1776–1851), German sculptor
- Dorothea Tieck (1799–1841), German translator
- Ludwig Tieck (1773–1853), German poet
  - 8056 Tieck, asteroid named after Ludwig Tieck
  - Schlegel-Tieck Prize, literary award named after Ludwig Tieck (and August Schlegel)
- Sophie Tieck (1775–1833), German Romantic writer and poet
