= Schlenk =

Schlenk can refer to:

== People ==
- Wilhelm Schlenk (1879-1943), German chemist

== In chemistry ==
- Schlenk flask
- Schlenk line. or Schlenk apparatus
- Schlenk equilibrium

== Other ==
- Mepco Schlenk Engineering College
