= Gas syringe =

Tool used in a laboratory

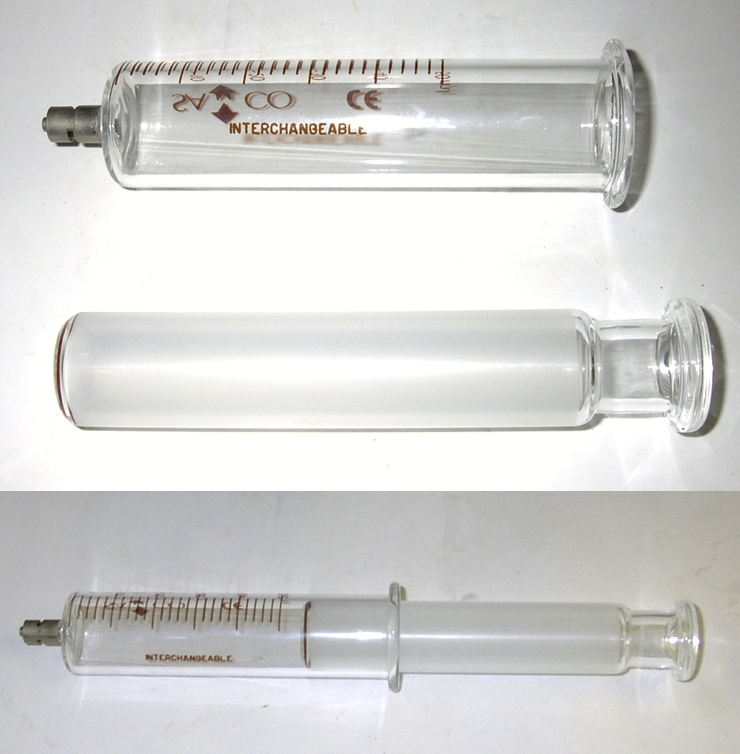
A gas syringe showing its components separated and assembled

A gas syringe is a piece of laboratory glassware used to insert or withdraw a volume of a gas from a closed system, or to measure the volume of gas evolved from a chemical reaction. A gas syringe can also be used to measure and dispense liquids, especially where these liquids need to be kept free from air.

A gas syringe has an inner syringe chamber which has a ground glass surface. The syringe barrel also has a ground glass surface. The ground surface of the barrel moves freely within the ground glass surface of the syringe chamber with very little friction. The close mating of these ground glass surfaces also gives a reasonably gas-tight seal. Like a ground glass stopcock, the two parts of a gas syringe should preferably not be interchanged with another gas syringe of the same volume, unless told otherwise by the distributor. Gas syringes come in various sizes from 500 ml to 0.25 ml and tend to be accurate to between 0.01 and 1 ml, depending on the size of the syringe.

== Gas syringe use ==
A gas syringe can be used to measure gaseous products from a reaction.

When using a gas syringe to measure gases it is important to keep the syringe free from liquids. As gases can dissolve in liquids, especially under any resulting pressure, this may result in inaccurate measurements (Henry's law).

The amount of gas in moles formed in a reaction can be measured by measuring the volume of gas evolved at standard (or known) pressure conditions (gas law, PV=nRT).

Accordingly, it is important that the syringe barrel should move freely within the syringe chamber, if one assumes that the measured gas is at standard temperature and pressure. Any friction would result in a pressure build-up in the syringe and would lead to an inaccurate measurement, that is, a lower amount of gas would be determined, than really obtained.

== Liquid use ==
Glass syringes are also conveniently used to measure and dispense solvents and other liquids. They are often used in air-free techniques to take solvents after they have been purified in stills, or from containers sealed with septa, to prevent gas entering the solution. They can also be use for transportation of substances that react spontaneously with air (pyrophoric reagents).

Liquids drawn up into a gas syringes can optionally be sparged with inert gas before dispensing into a reaction vessel such as a Schlenk flask. This is done by drawing the liquid into the syringe via a needle, inserting the needle into the septum sealing a flask under a positive pressure of an inert gas, removing the glass plunger, and allowing the gas to bubble through the liquid in the syringe for several minutes. The glass plunger is then re-inserted and the liquid is added to the reaction flask. Other techniques such as cannulation can also be used to transfer liquids instead.
