= Air-free technique =

Chemistry laboratory technique

Air-free techniques refer to a range of manipulations in the chemistry laboratory for the handling of compounds that are air-sensitive. These techniques prevent the compounds from reacting with components of air, usually water and oxygen; less commonly carbon dioxide and nitrogen. A common theme among these techniques is the use of a fine (10^{0}–10^{−3} Torr) or high (10^{−3}–10^{−6} Torr) vacuum to remove air, and the use of an inert gas: preferably argon, but often nitrogen.

The two most common types of air-free technique involve the use of a glovebox and a Schlenk line, although some rigorous applications use a high-vacuum line. In both methods, glassware (often Schlenk tubes) are pre-dried in ovens prior to use. They may be flame-dried to remove adsorbed water. Prior to coming into an inert atmosphere, vessels are further dried by purge-and-refill — the vessel is subjected to a vacuum to remove gases and water, and then refilled with inert gas. This cycle is usually repeated three times or the vacuum is applied for an extended period of time. One of the differences between the use of a glovebox and a Schlenk line is where the purge-and-refill cycle is applied. When using a glovebox the purge-and-refill is applied to an airlock attached to the glovebox, commonly called the "port" or "ante-chamber". In contrast when using a Schlenk line the purge-and-refill is applied directly to the reaction vessel through a hose or ground glass joint that is connected to the manifold.

== Glovebox ==
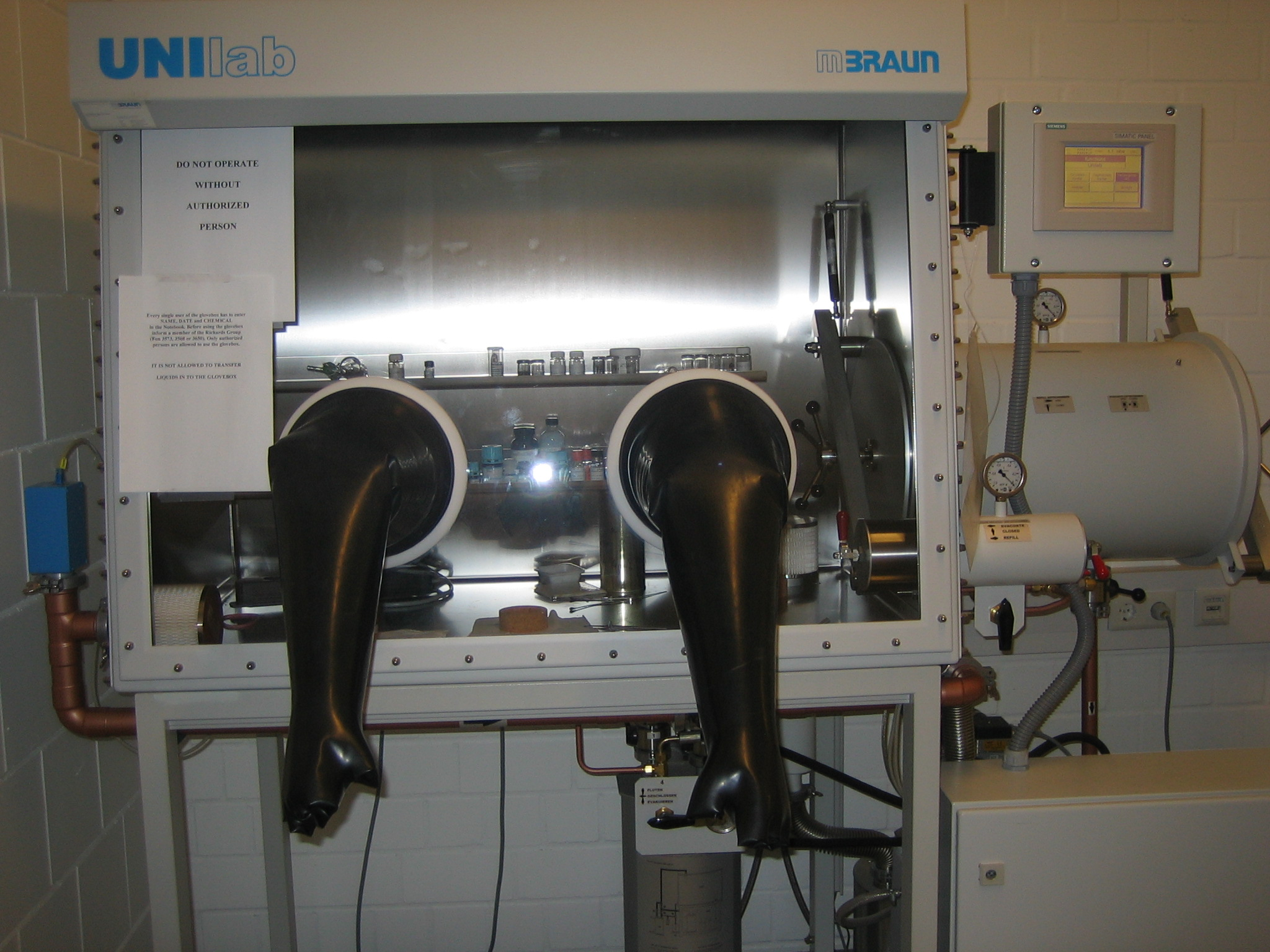
An ordinary glovebox, showing the two gloves for manipulation, with airlock on the right.

The most straightforward type of air-free technique is the use of a glovebox. A "glove bag" uses the same idea, but is usually a poorer substitute because it is more difficult to purge, and less well sealed. Inventive ways of accessing items beyond the reach of the gloves exist, such as the use of tongs and strings. The main drawbacks to using a glovebox are the cost of the glovebox, and limited dexterity while wearing the gloves.

In the glovebox, conventional laboratory equipment can often be set up and manipulated, despite the need to handle the apparatus with the gloves. By providing a sealed but recirculating atmosphere of the inert gas, the glove box necessitates few other precautions. Cross contamination of samples due to poor technique is also problematic, especially where a glovebox is shared between workers using differing reagents, volatile ones in particular.

Two styles have evolved in the use of gloveboxes for synthetic chemistry. In a more conservative mode, they are used solely to store, weigh, and transfer air-sensitive reagents. Reactions are thereafter carried out using Schlenk techniques. The gloveboxes are thus only used for the most air-sensitive stages in an experiment. In their more liberal use, gloveboxes are used for the entire synthetic operations including reactions in solvents, work-up, and preparation of samples for spectroscopy.

Not all reagents and solvents are acceptable for use in the glovebox, although different laboratories adopt different cultures. The "box atmosphere" is usually continuously deoxygenated over a copper catalyst. Certain volatile chemicals such as halogenated compounds and especially strongly coordinating species such as phosphines and thiols can be problematic because they irreversibly poison the copper catalyst. Because of this, many experimentalists choose to handle such compounds using Schlenk techniques. In the more liberal use of gloveboxes, it is accepted that the copper catalyst will require more frequent replacement but this cost is considered to be an acceptable trade-off for the efficiency of conducting an entire synthesis within a protected environment

== Schlenk line ==
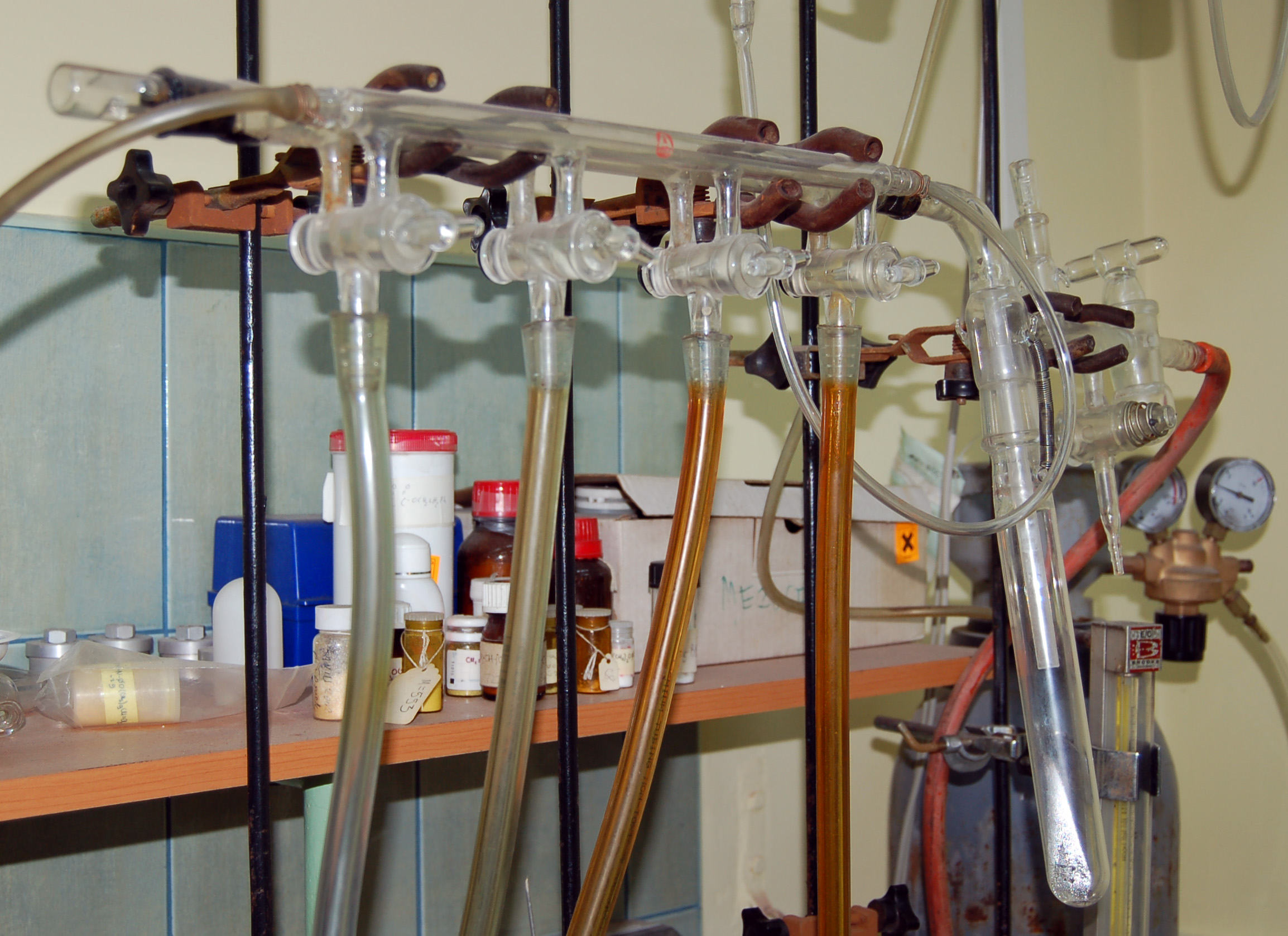
A Schlenk line with four ports.

The other main technique for the preparation and handing of air-sensitive compounds are associated with the use of a Schlenk line. The main techniques include:

- counterflow additions, where air-stable reagents are added to the reaction vessel against a flow of inert gas.
- the use of syringes and rubber septa (stoppers that reseal after puncturing) to transfer liquids and solutions
- cannula transfer, where liquids or solutions of air-sensitive reagents are transferred between different vessels stoppered with septa using a long thin tube known as a cannula. Liquid flow is achieved via vacuum or inert gas pressure.
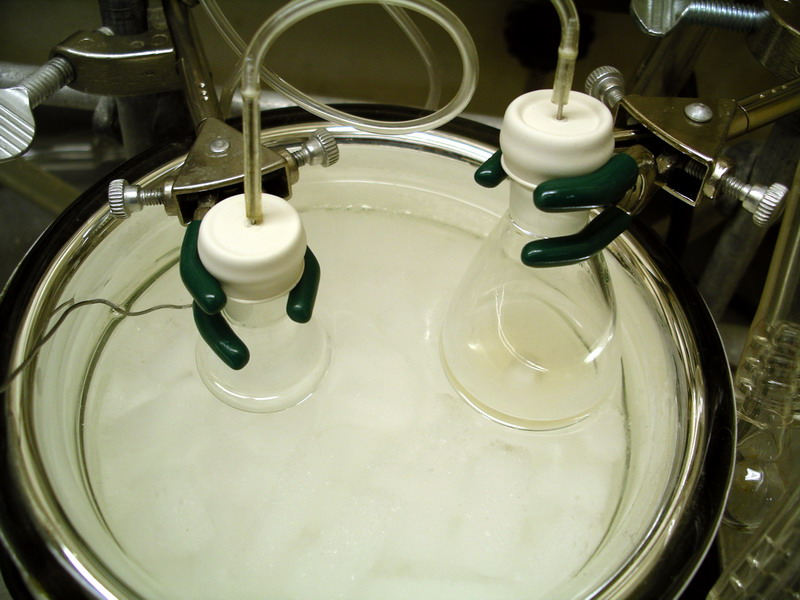
  A cannula is used to transfer THF from the flask on the right to the flask on the left.

Glassware are usually connected via tightly-fitting and greased ground glass joints. Round bends of glass tubing with ground glass joints may be used to adjust the orientation of various vessels. Filtrations may be accomplished by dedicated equipment.

== Associated preparations ==
Commercially available purified inert gas (argon or nitrogen) is adequate for most purposes. However, for certain applications, it is necessary to further remove water and oxygen. This additional purification can be accomplished by piping the inert gas line through a heated column of copper, which converts the oxygen to copper oxide. Water is removed by piping the gas through a column of desiccant such as phosphorus pentoxide or molecular sieves.

Air- and water-free solvents are also necessary. If high-purity solvents are available in nitrogen-purged Winchesters, they can be brought directly into the glovebox. For use with Schlenk technique, they can be quickly poured into Schlenk flasks charged with molecular sieves, and degassed. More typically, solvent is dispensed directly from a still or solvent purification column.

=== Degassing ===
Two procedures for degassing are common. The first is known as freeze-pump-thaw — the solvent is frozen under liquid nitrogen, and a vacuum is applied. Thereafter, the stopcock is closed and the solvent is thawed in warm water, allowing trapped bubbles of gas to escape.

The second procedure is to simply subject the solvent to a vacuum. Stirring or mechanical agitation using an ultrasonicator is useful. Dissolved gases evolve first; once the solvent starts to evaporate, noted by condensation outside the flask walls, the flask is refilled with inert gas. Both procedures are repeated three times.

=== Drying ===
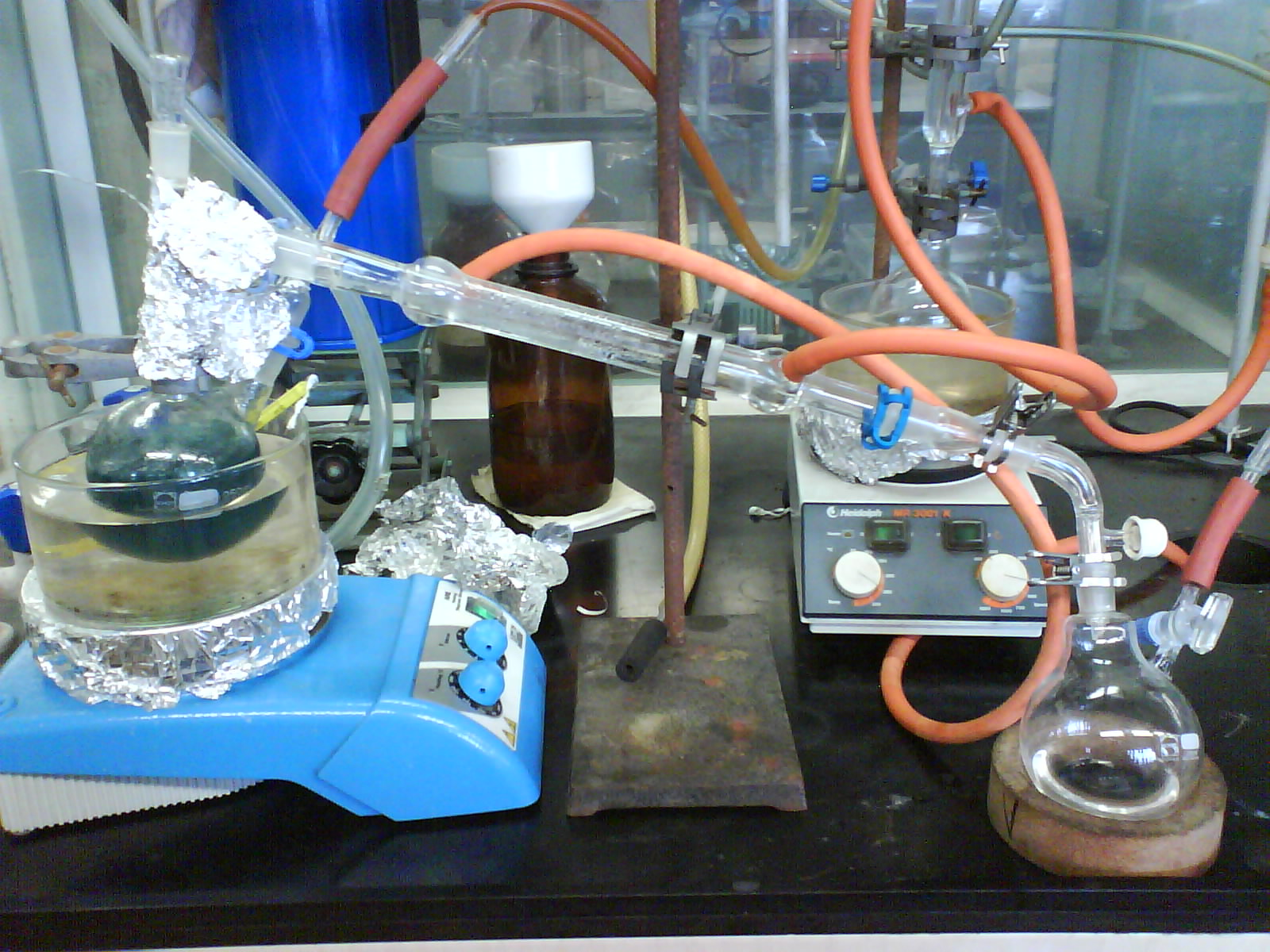
After being refluxed with sodium and benzophenone to remove oxygen and water, toluene is distilled under inert gas into a receiving flask.

Solvents are a major source of contamination in chemical reactions. Although traditional drying techniques involve distillation from an aggressive desiccant, molecular sieves are far superior.

Drying of toluene
Drying agent	Duration of drying	water content
untreated	0 h	225 ppm
Sodium/benzophenone	48 h	31 ppm
3 Å molecular sieves	24 h	0.9 ppm

Aside from being inefficient, sodium as a desiccant (below its melting point) reacts slowly with trace amounts of water. When however, the desiccant is soluble, the speed of drying is accelerated, although still inferior to molecular sieves. Benzophenone is often used to generate such a soluble drying agent. An advantage to this application is the intense blue color of the ketyl radical anion. Thus, sodium/benzophenone can be used as an indicator of air-free and moisture-free conditions in the purification of solvents by distillation.

Distillation stills are fire hazards and are increasingly being replaced by alternative solvent-drying systems. Popular are systems for the filtration of deoxygenated solvents through columns filled with activated alumina.

Drying of solids can be brought about by storing the solid over a drying agent such as phosphorus pentoxide (P_{2}O_{5}) or silica gel, storing in a drying oven/vacuum-drying oven, heating under a high vacuum or in a drying pistol, or to remove trace amounts of water, simply storing the solid in a glove box that has a dry atmosphere.

== Alternatives ==
Both these techniques require rather expensive equipment and can be time consuming. Where air-free requirements are not stringent, other techniques can be used. For example, using a sacrificial excess of a reagent that reacts with water/oxygen can be used. The sacrificial excess in effect "dries" the reaction by reacting with the water (e.g. in the solvent). However, this method is only suitable where the impurities produced in this reaction are not in turn detrimental to the desired product of the reaction or can be easily removed. Typically, reactions using such a sacrificial excess are only effective when doing reactions on a reasonably large scale such that this by-reaction is negligible compared to the desired product reaction. For example, when preparing Grignard reagents, magnesium (the cheapest reagent) is often used in excess, which reacts to remove trace water, either by reacting directly with water to give magnesium hydroxide or via the in situ formation of the Grignard reagent which in turn reacts with water (e.g. R-Mg-X + H_{2}O → HO-Mg-X + R-H). To maintain the resultant "dry" environment it is usually sufficient to connect a guard tube filled with calcium chloride to the reflux condenser to slow moisture re-entering the reaction over time, or connect an inert gas line.

Drying can also be achieved by the use of in situ desiccants such as molecular sieves, or the use of azeotropic distillation techniques e.g. with a Dean-Stark apparatus.

== Detection of O_{2} and water ==
A number of reagents can be used to detect and/or destroy O_{2} and water. Deeply colored radicals are often used because they bleach upon reaction with water and oxygen. One such reagent is benzophenone ketyl, which is easily generated by this reaction

Na + Ph_{2}CO → Na^{+}Ph_{2}CO^{•−}

This deep purple ketyl rapidly gives colorless products upon oxidation or hydrolysis Another reagent is generated in situ by treatment of titanocene dichloride with zinc. That blue green Ti(III)-containing solution is highly sensitive to oxygen. Such solutions are useful for testing the inertness of an atmosphere within a glove box.

== See also ==
- Sparging (chemistry)
- Degasification
- Schlenk-frit

== Gallery ==
Perkin triangle: Air-sensitive distillations

Air-free filtration

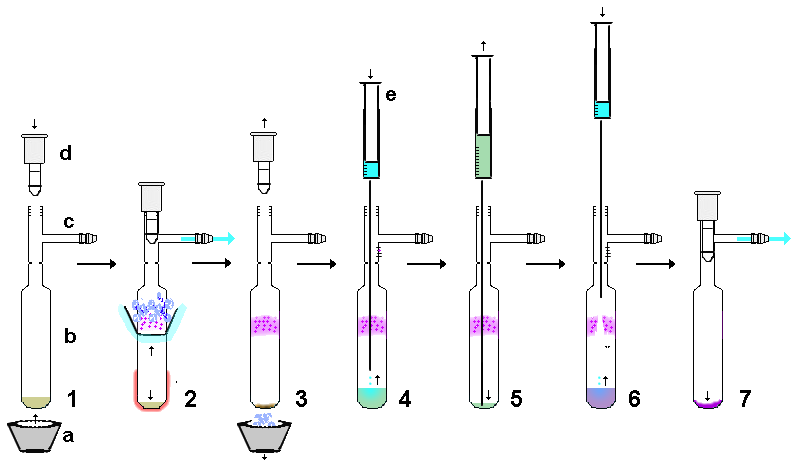
Air-free sublimation

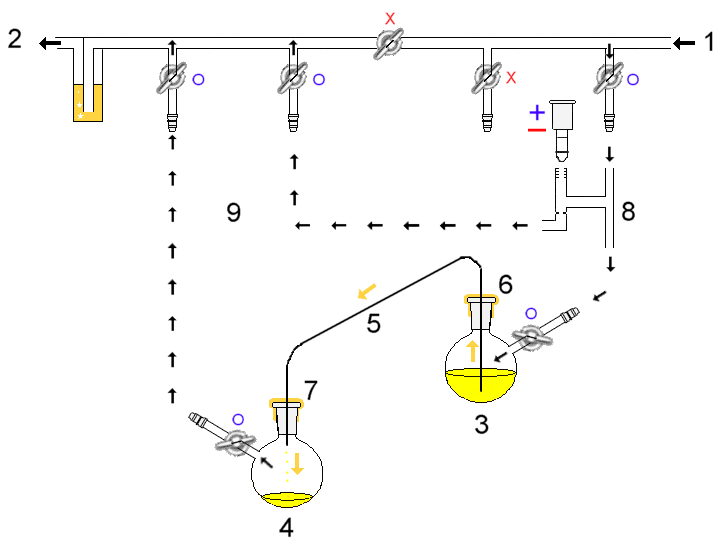
Cannula: intra-bleed valve

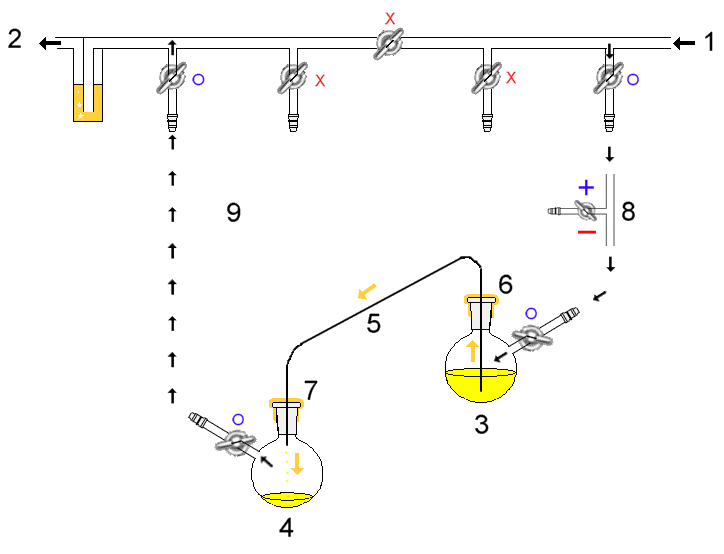
Cannula: extra-bleed valve

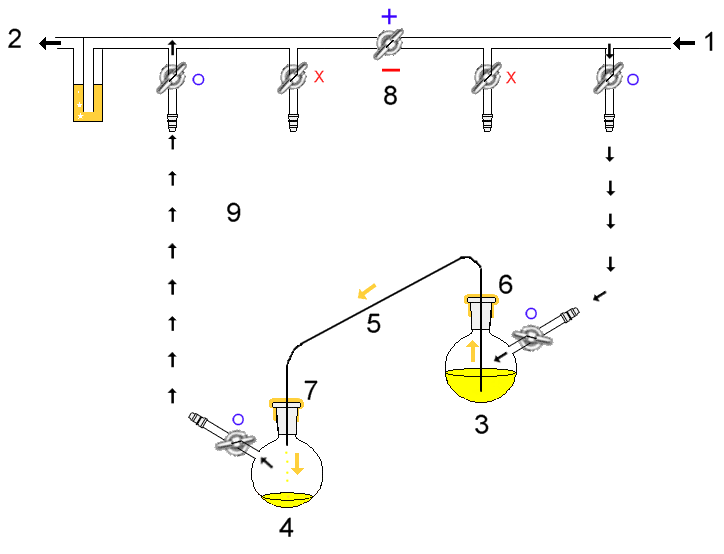
Cannula: (Simple) no bleed valve

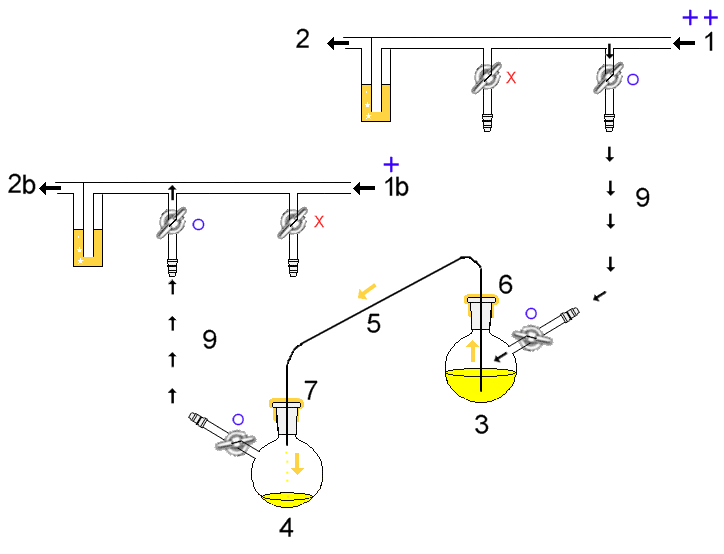
Cannula: two manifold system

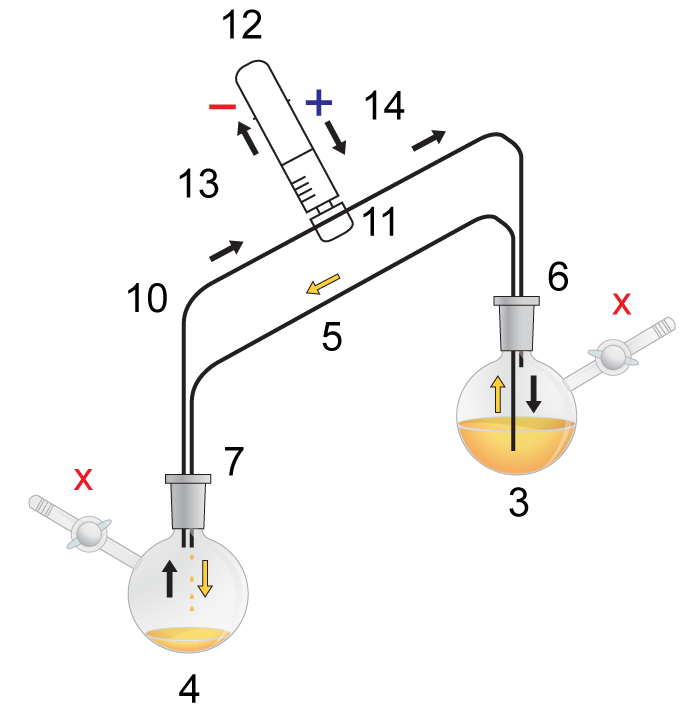
Cannula: syringe valve

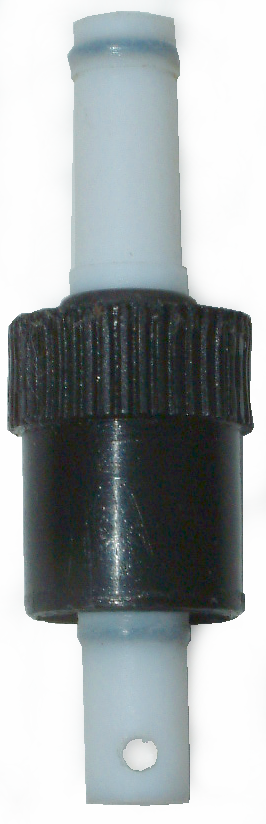
Teflon tap for air-sensitive NMR samples
