= Wilhelm Schlenk =

German chemist (1879–1943)

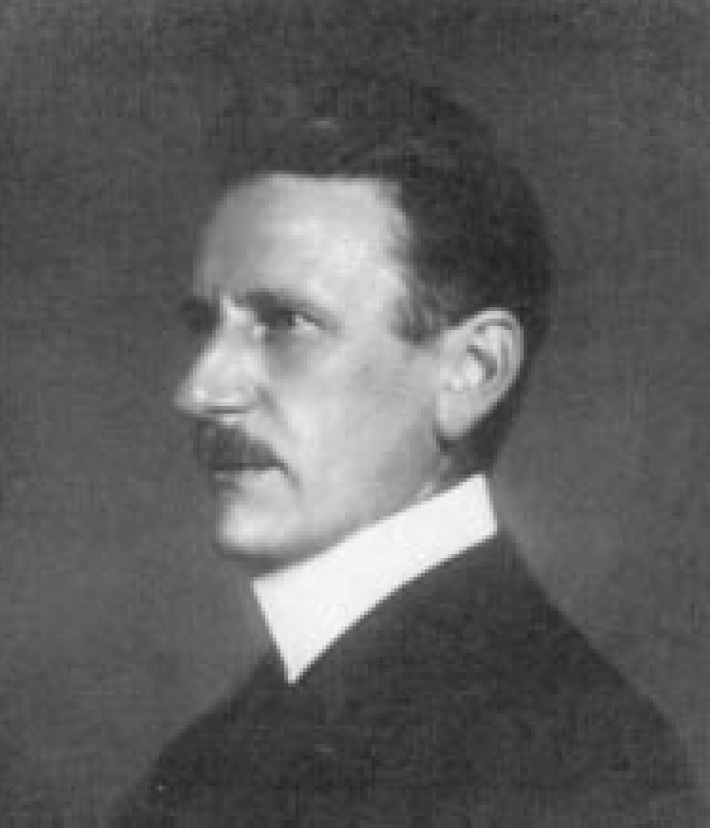
- Wilhelm Johann Schlenk
- Born: Wilhelm Johann Schlenk; 22 March 1879; Munich, German Empire
- Died: 29 April 1943 (aged 64); Tübingen, Germany
- Education: Ludwig-Maximilians-Universität München
- Known for: Schlenk flask Schlenk line
- Awards: Lieben Prize (1917)
- Scientific career
- Workplaces: Ludwig-Maximilians-Universität München, University of Jena, University of Vienna, Friedrich Wilhelm University of Berlin, University of Tübingen
- Doctoral advisor: Oskar Piloty
- Doctoral students: Herman Mark; Fritz Feigl; Ernst David Bergmann

Wilhelm Johann Schlenk (22 March 1879 – 29 April 1943) was a German chemist. He was born in Munich and studied chemistry there at Ludwig-Maximilians-Universität München. Schlenk succeeded Emil Fischer at the Friedrich Wilhelm University of Berlin in 1919.

Schlenk was an organic chemist who discovered organolithium compounds around 1917. He also investigated free radicals and carbanions and discovered (together with his son) that organomagnesium halides are capable of participating in a complex chemical equilibrium, now known as a Schlenk equilibrium.

Today Schlenk is remembered mostly for developing techniques to handle air-sensitive compounds and for his invention of the Schlenk flask. The latter is a reaction vessel with a glass or Teflon tap for the addition and removal of gases, such as nitrogen or argon. He is also known for the Schlenk line, a double manifold incorporating a vacuum system and a gas line joined by double oblique taps that allow the user to switch between vacuum and gas for the manipulation of air-sensitive compounds.
