= Spatula (disambiguation) =

A spatula is a cooking utensil.

Spatula may also refer to:

- A utensil for scientific work
- Frosting spatula, used for frosting cakes
- Fish slice (kitchen utensil)
- Putty knife, used (by tradesmen) for spreading materials such as window putty, plaster or paint
- Palette knife, used (by artists) for spreading or mixing paints (and other art mediums)
- Spatulae (biology), nanometer-scale projections covering the setae on the footpads of geckos
- Spatula (bird), a genus of ducks
