= Schlenk line =

Glass apparatus used in chemistry

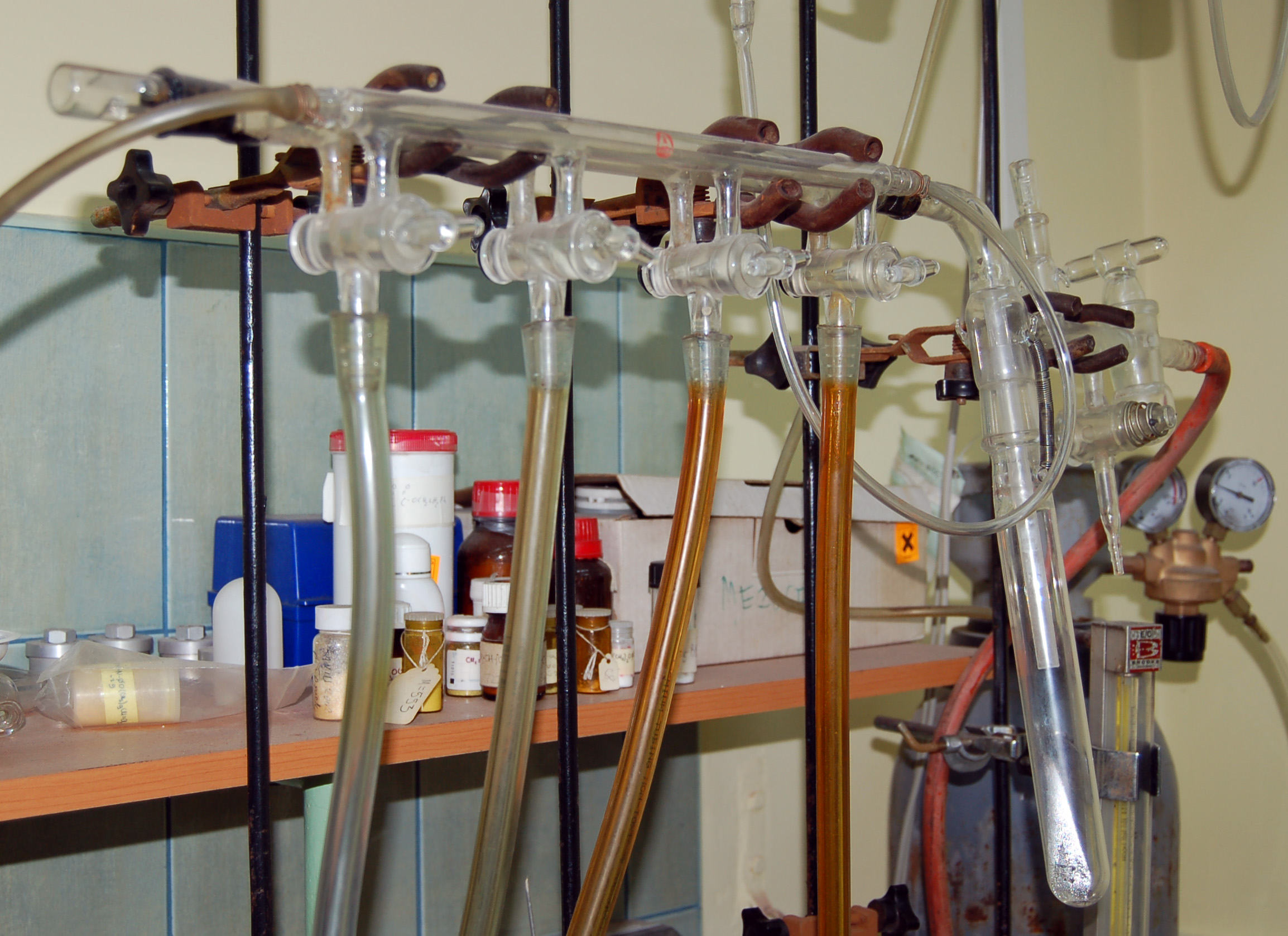
A Schlenk line with four ports. The cold trap is on the right.

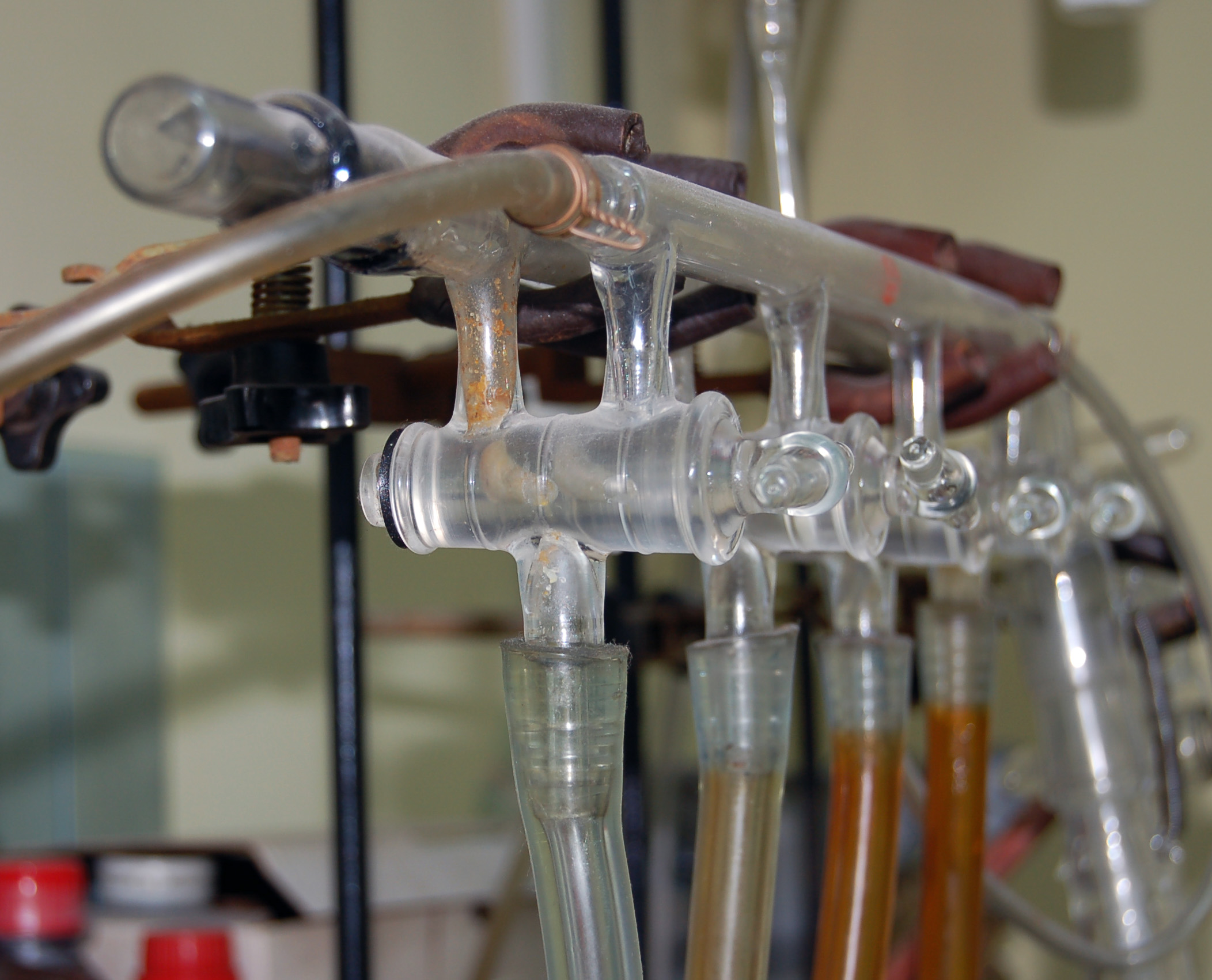
Close-up view, showing the double-oblique stopcock, which allows vacuum (rear line) or inert gas (front line) to be selected

The Schlenk line (also vacuum gas manifold) is a commonly used chemistry apparatus developed by Wilhelm Schlenk. It consists of a dual manifold with several ports. One manifold is connected to a source of purified inert gas, while the other is connected to a vacuum pump. The inert-gas line is vented through an oil bubbler, while solvent vapors and gaseous reaction products are prevented from contaminating the vacuum pump by a liquid-nitrogen or dry-ice/acetone cold trap. Special stopcocks or Teflon taps allow vacuum or inert gas to be selected without the need for placing the sample on a separate line.

Schlenk lines are useful for manipulating moisture- and air-sensitive compounds. The vacuum is used to remove air or other gasses present in closed, connected glassware to the line. It often also removes the last traces of solvent from a sample. Vacuum and gas manifolds often have many ports and lines, and with care, it is possible for several reactions or operations to be run simultaneously in inert conditions.

When the reagents are highly susceptible to oxidation, traces of oxygen may pose a problem. Then, for the removal of oxygen below the ppm level, the inert gas needs to be purified by passing it through a deoxygenation catalyst. This is usually a column of copper(I) or manganese(II) oxide, which reacts with oxygen traces present in the inert gas. In other cases, a purge-cycle technique is often employed, where the closed, reaction vessel connected to the line is filled with inert gas, evacuated with the vacuum and then refilled. This process is repeated 3 or more times to make sure air is rigorously removed. Moisture can be removed by heating the reaction vessel with a heat gun.

== Techniques ==
The main techniques associated with the use of a Schlenk line include:

- counterflow additions, where air-stable reagents are added to the reaction vessel against a flow of inert gas;
- the use of syringes and rubber septa to transfer liquids and solutions;
- cannula transfer, where liquids or solutions of air-sensitive reagents are transferred between different vessels stoppered with septa using a long thin tube known as a cannula. Liquid flow is supported by vacuum or inert-gas pressure.

Glassware are usually connected by tightly fitting and greased ground glass joints. Round bends of glass tubing with ground glass joints may be used to adjust the orientation of various vessels. Glassware is necessarily purged of outside air by using the purge cycling technique. The solvents and reagents that are used can use a technique called "sparging" to remove air. This is where a cannula needle, which is connected to the inert gas on the line, is inserted into the reaction vessel containing the solvent; this effectively bubbles the inert gas into the solution, which will actively push out trapped gas molecules from the solvent.

Filtration under inert conditions poses a special challenge. It is usually achieved using a "cannula filter". Classically, filtration is tackled with a Schlenk filter, which consists of a sintered glass funnel fitted with joints and stopcocks that is sometimes called a Schlenk frit. By fitting the pre-dried funnel and receiving flask to the reaction flask against a flow of nitrogen, carefully inverting the set-up and turning on the vacuum appropriately, the filtration may be accomplished with minimal exposure to air.

A glovebox is often used in conjunction with the Schlenk line for storing and reusing air- and moisture-sensitive solvents in a lab.

== Dangers ==
The main dangers associated with the use of a Schlenk line are the risks of an implosion or explosion. An implosion can occur due to the use of vacuum and flaws in the glass apparatus.

An explosion can occur due to the common use of liquid nitrogen in the cold trap, used to protect the vacuum pump from solvents. If a reasonable amount of air is allowed to enter the Schlenk line, liquid oxygen can condense into the cold trap as a pale blue liquid. An explosion may occur due to reaction of the liquid oxygen with any organic compounds also in the trap.

== Gallery ==
Vacuum/gas manifold setup: 1 inert gas in, 2 inert gas out (to bubbler), 3 vacuum (to cold traps) 4 reaction line, 5 Teflon tap to gas, 6 Teflon tap to vacuum

Vacuum/gas manifold setup: 1 inert gas in, 2 inert gas out (to bubbler), 3 vacuum (to cold traps), 4 reaction line, 5 double oblique stopcock (i.e. a glass tap with 2 separate parallel "channels/lines" that run diagonal to the axis of the tap)

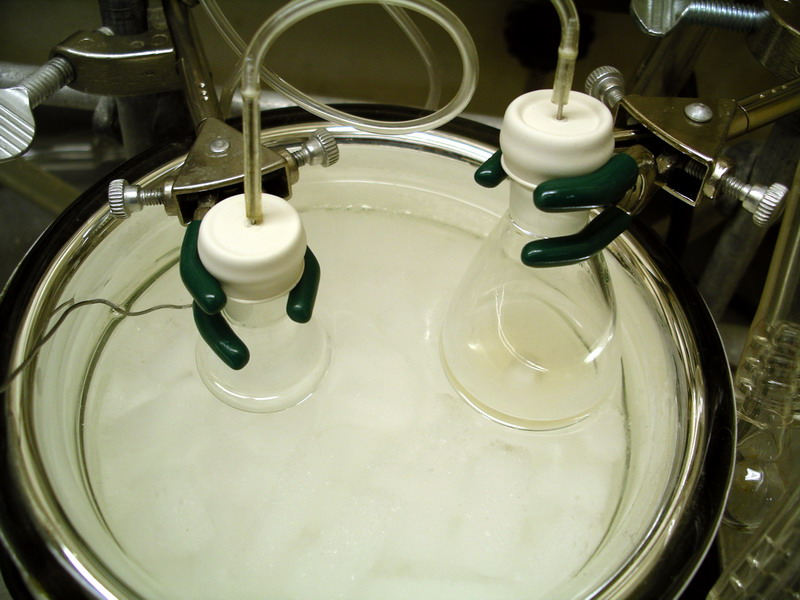
The two reactants for an aldol reaction are prepared in adjacent flasks, ready for one to be transferred to the other while maintaining air-free conditions

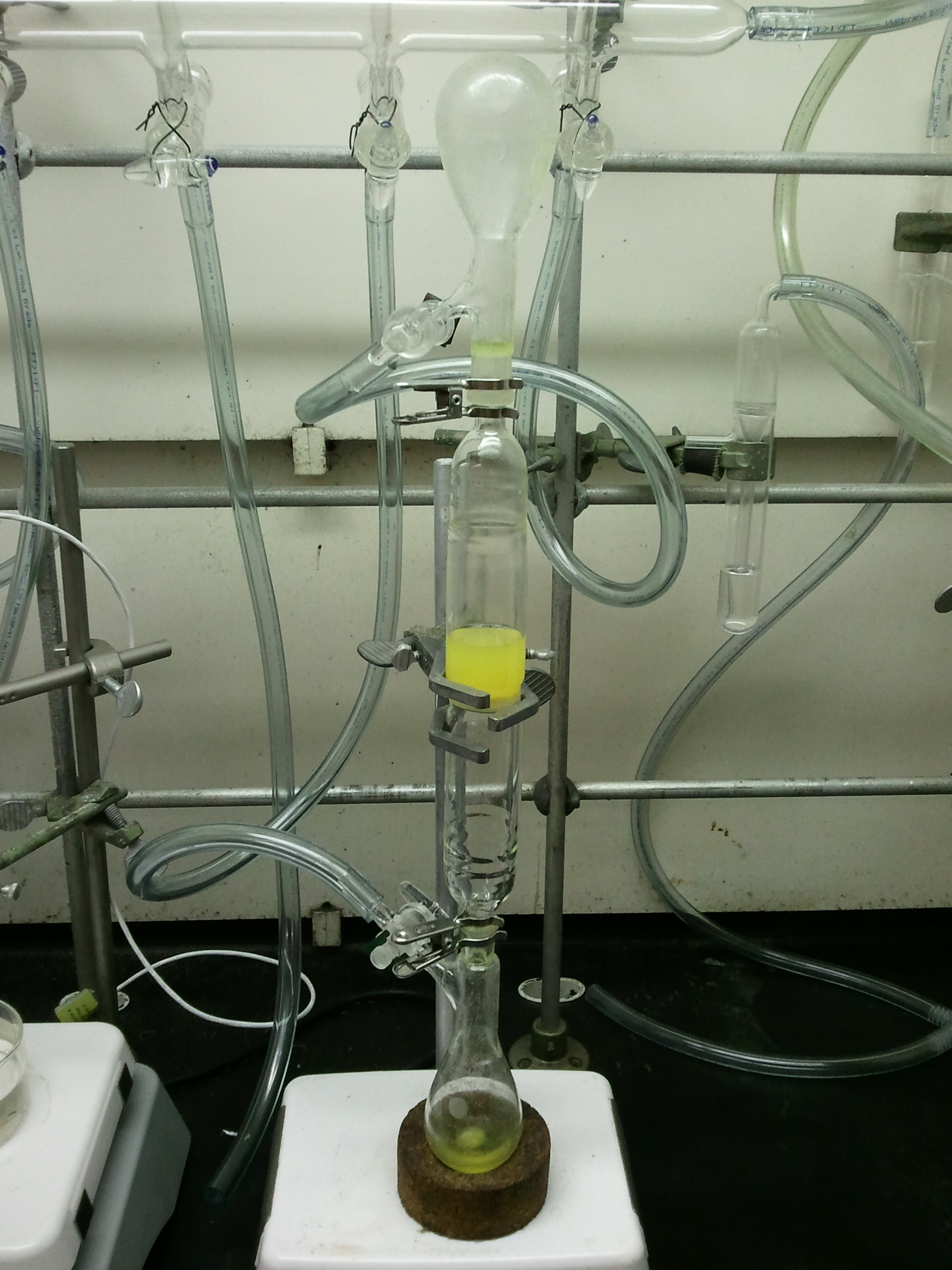
A yellow suspension is filtered through a sintered-glass funnel into another Schlenk flask under air-free conditions

== See also ==
- Air-free technique gives a broad overview of methods including:
  - Glovebox – used to manipulate air-sensitive (oxygen- or moisture-sensitive) chemicals.
  - Schlenk flask – reaction vessel for handling air-sensitive compounds.
  - Perkin triangle – used for the distillation of air-sensitive compounds.
