= Schlenk flask =

Reaction vessel used in air-sensitive chemistry

- A selection of Schlenk flasks and, bottom right, a Schlenk tube
- Other names: Schlenk tube
- Uses: Vacuum; Inert gas
- Inventor: Wilhelm Schlenk
- Related items: Schlenk line

A Schlenk flask, or Schlenk tube, is a reaction vessel typically used in air-sensitive chemistry, invented by Wilhelm Schlenk. It has a side arm fitted with a PTFE or ground glass stopcock, which allows the vessel to be evacuated or filled with gases (usually inert gases like nitrogen or argon). These flasks are often connected to Schlenk lines, which allow both operations to be done easily.

Schlenk flasks and Schlenk tubes, like most laboratory glassware, are made from borosilicate glass.

Schlenk flasks are round-bottomed, while Schlenk tubes are elongated. They may be purchased off-the-shelf from laboratory suppliers or made from round-bottom flasks or glass tubing by a skilled glassblower.

== Evacuating a Schlenk flask ==
Typically, before solvent or reagents are introduced into a Schlenk flask, the flask is dried and the atmosphere of the flask is exchanged with an inert gas. A common method of exchanging the atmosphere of the flask is to flush the flask out with an inert gas. The gas can be introduced through the sidearm of the flask, or via a wide bore needle (attached to a gas line). The contents of the flask exit the flask through the neck portion of the flask. The needle method has the advantage that the needle can be placed at the bottom of the flask to better flush out the atmosphere of the flask. Flushing a flask out with an inert gas can be inefficient for large flasks and is impractical for complex apparatus.

An alternative way to exchange the atmosphere of a Schlenk flask is to use one or more "vac-refill" cycles, typically using a vacuum-gas manifold, also known as a Schlenk line. This involves pumping the air out of the flask and replacing the resulting vacuum with an inert gas. For example, evacuation of the flask to 1 mmHg (130 Pa; 0.0013 atm) and then replenishing the atmosphere with 760 mmHg (1 atm) inert gas leaves 0.13% of the original atmosphere (1/760). Two such vac-refill cycles leaves 0.000173% (1/760^{2}). Most Schlenk lines easily and quickly achieve a vacuum of 1 mmHg (~1.3 mBar).

== Varieties ==
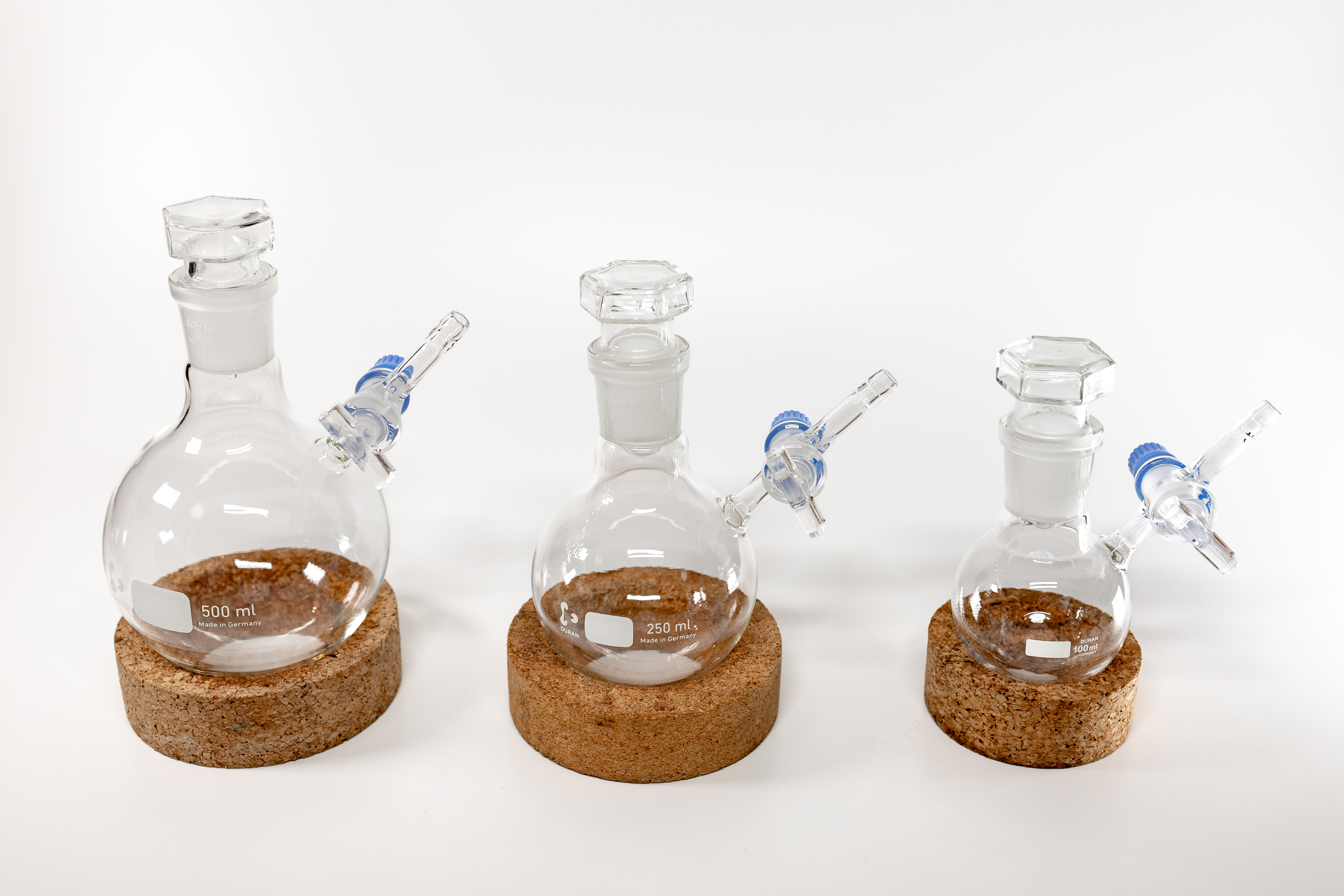
Three Schlenk flasks with 500, 250 and 100 mL volume on cork rings.

When using Schlenk systems, including flasks, the use of grease is often necessary at stopcock valves and ground glass joints to provide a gas tight seal and prevent glass pieces from fusing. In contrast, teflon plug valves may have a trace of oil as a lubricant but generally no grease. In the following text any "connection" is assumed to be rendered mostly air free through a series of vac-refill cycles.

=== Standard Schlenk flask ===
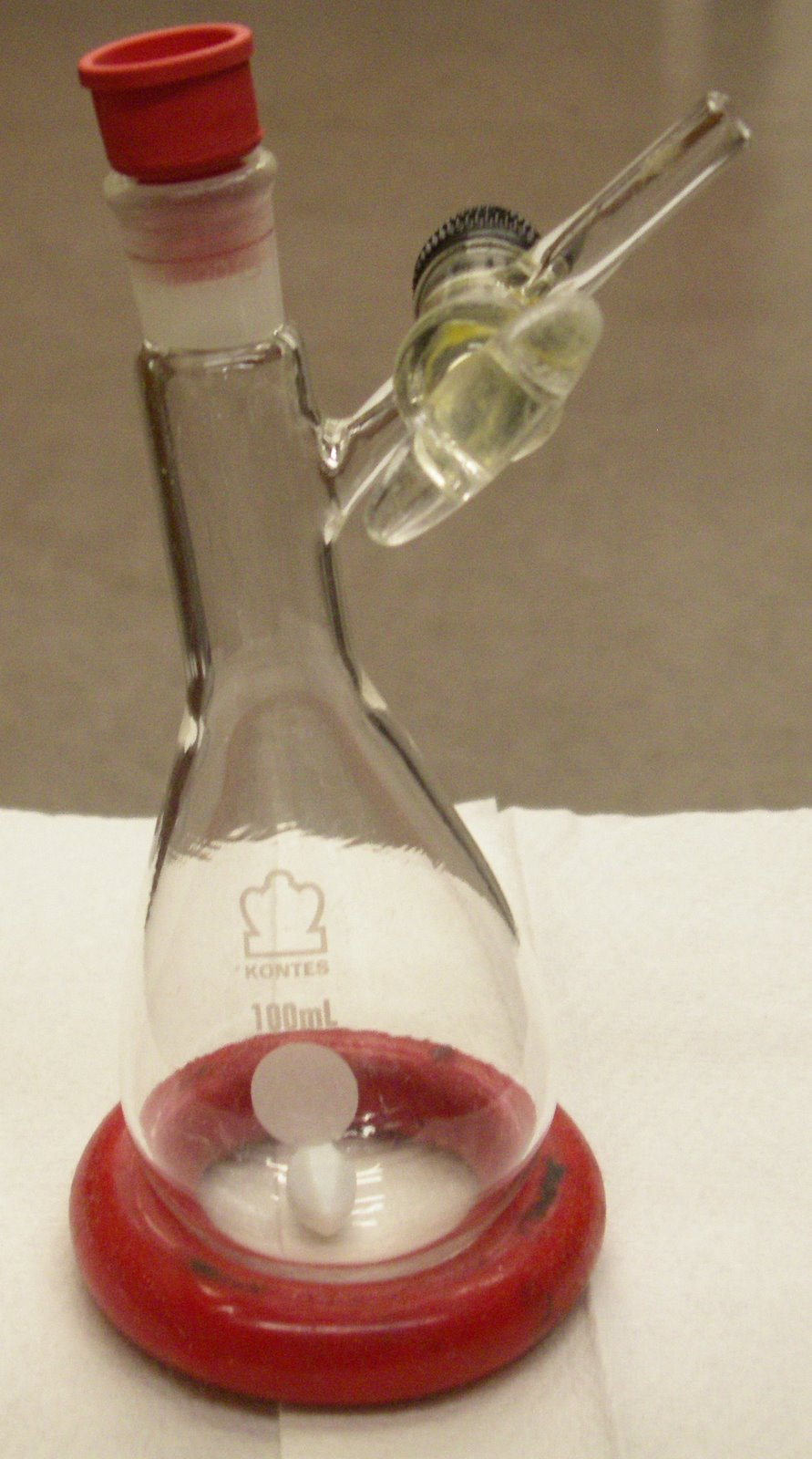
A pear-shaped Schlenk flask. The flask's sidearm contains a greased stopcock valve, and the flask is capped with a Suba•Seal septum that has not been turned down.

The standard Schlenk flask is a round bottom, pear-shaped, or tubular flask with a ground glass joint and a side arm. The side arm contains a valve, usually a greased stopcock, used to control the flask's exposure to a manifold or the atmosphere. This allows a material to be added to a flask through the ground glass joint, which is then capped with a septum. This operation can, for example, be done in a glove box. The flask can then be removed from the glove box and taken to a Schlenk line. Once connected to the Schlenk line, the inert gas and/or vacuum can be applied to the flask as required. While the flask is connected to the line under a positive pressure of inert gas, the septum can be replaced with other apparatus, for example a reflux condenser. Once the manipulations are complete, the contents can be vacuum dried and placed under a static vacuum by closing the side arm valve. These evacuated flasks can be taken back into a glove box for further manipulation or storage of the flasks' contents.

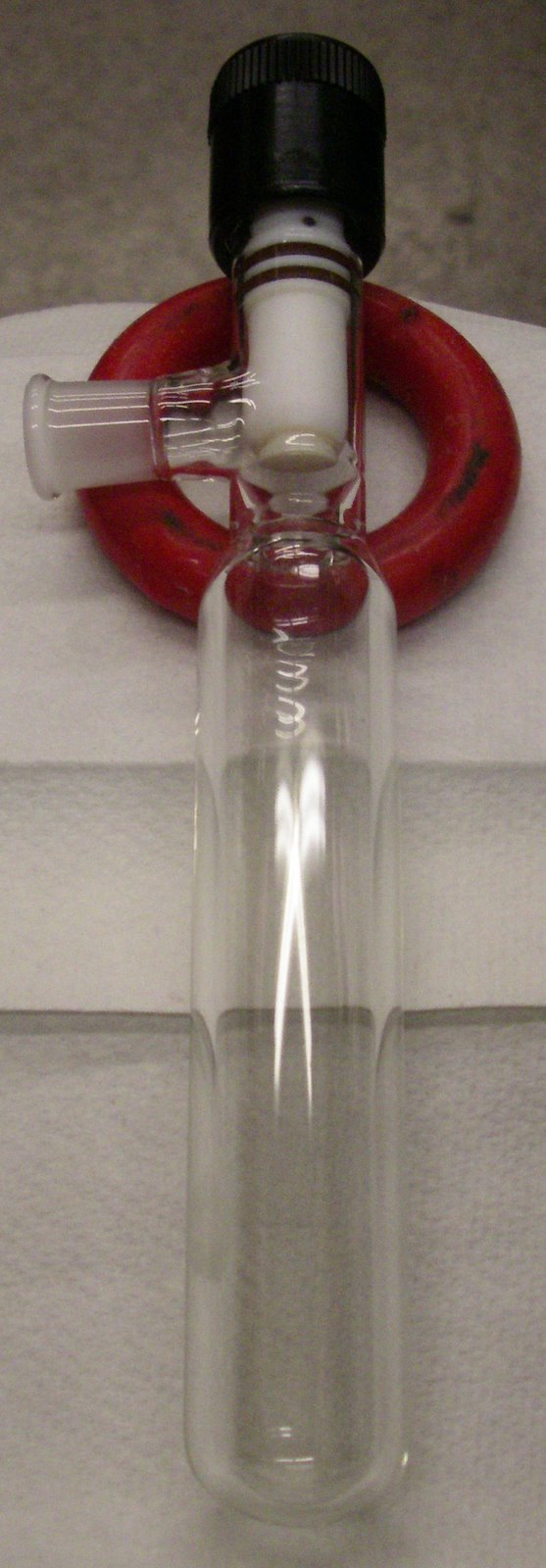
A heavy walled, tube shaped, Schlenk bomb fitted with a large bore plug valve designed for high temperature closed system reactions.

=== Schlenk bomb ===
A "bomb" flask is subclass of Schlenk flask which includes all flasks that have only one opening accessed by opening a Teflon plug valve. This design allows a Schlenk bomb to be sealed more completely than a standard Schlenk flask even if its septum or glass cap is wired on. Schlenk bombs include structurally sound shapes such as round bottoms and heavy walled tubes. Schlenk bombs are often used to conduct reactions at elevated pressures and temperatures as a closed system. In addition, all Schlenk bombs are designed to withstand the pressure differential created by the ante-chamber when pumping solvents into a glove box.

In practice Schlenk bombs can perform many of the functions of a standard Schlenk flask. Even when the opening is used to fit a bomb to a manifold, the plug can still be removed to add or remove material from the bomb. In some situations, however, Schlenk bombs are less convenient than standard Schlenk flasks: they lack an accessible ground glass joint to attach additional apparatus; the opening provided by plug valves can be difficult to access with a spatula, and it can be much simpler to work with a septum designed to fit a ground glass joint than with a Teflon plug.

The name "bomb" is often applied to containers used under pressure such as a bomb calorimeter. While glass does not equal the pressure rating and mechanical strength of most metal containers, it does have several advantages. Glass allows visual inspection of a reaction in progress, it is inert to a wide range of reaction conditions and substrates, it is generally more compatible with common laboratory glassware, and it is more easily cleaned and checked for cleanliness.

=== Straus flask ===
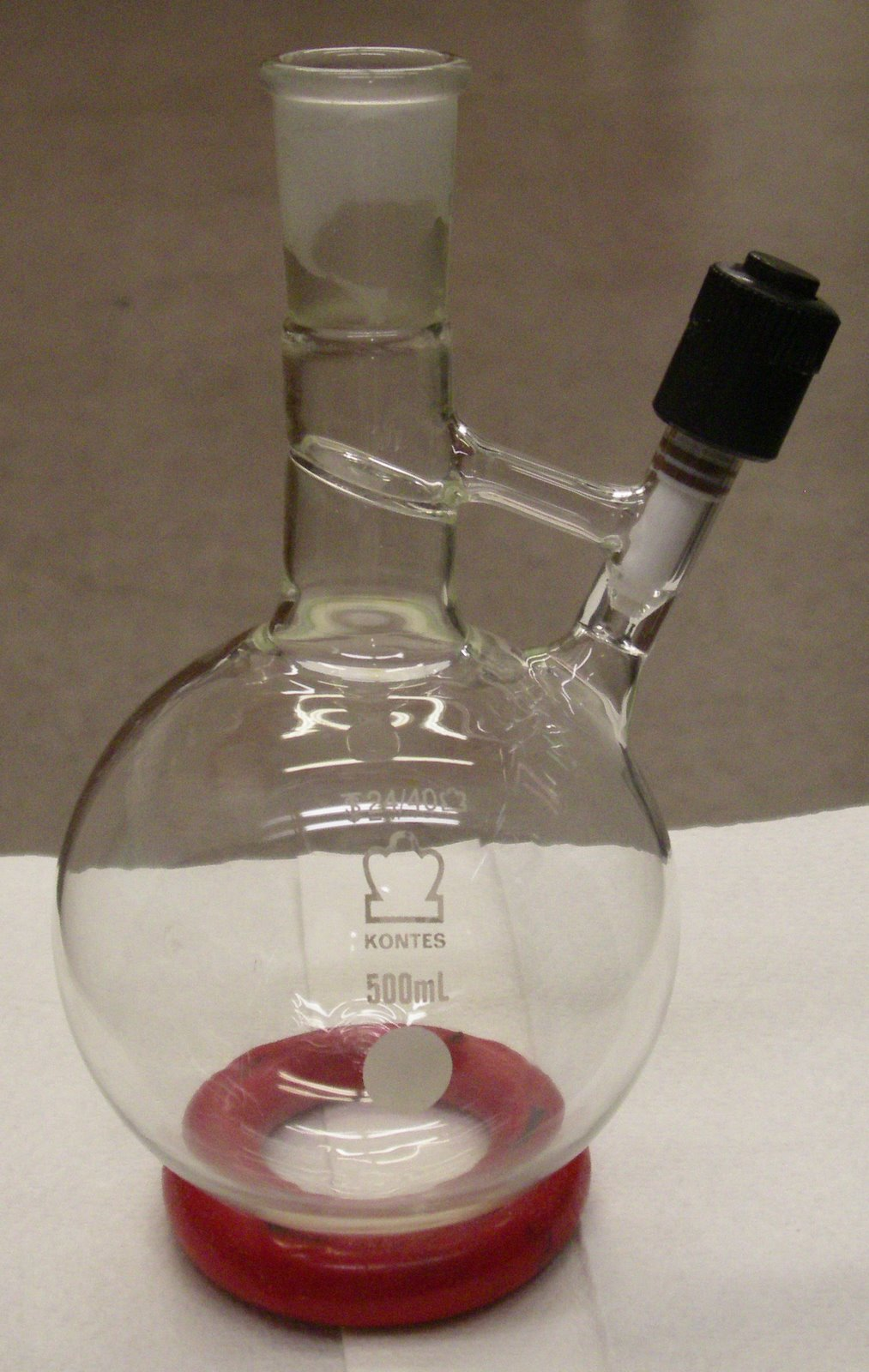
A Straus flask often called a solvent bomb. "Solvent bomb" is any Schlenk bomb dedicated to storing solvent. It is the construction of the flask neck which makes a Straus flask unique.

A Straus flask (often misspelled "Strauss") is subclass of "bomb" flask originally developed by Kontes Glass Company, commonly used for storing dried and degassed solvents. Straus flasks are sometimes referred to as solvent bombs — a name which applies to any Schlenk bomb dedicated to storing solvent. Straus flasks are mainly differentiated from other "bombs" by their neck structure. Two necks emerge from a round bottom flask, one larger than the other. The larger neck ends in a ground glass joint and is permanently partitioned by blown glass from direct access to the flask. The smaller neck includes the threading required for a teflon plug to be screwed in perpendicular to the flask. The two necks are joined through a glass tube. The ground glass joint can be connected to a manifold directly or through an adapter and hosing. Once connected, the plug valve can be partially opened to allow the solvent in the Straus flask to be vacuum transferred to other vessels. Or, once connected to the line, the neck can be placed under a positive pressure of inert gas and the plug valve can be fully removed. This allows direct access to the flask through a narrow glass tube now protected by a curtain of inert gas. The solvent can then be transferred through cannula to another flask. In contrast, other bomb flask plugs are not necessarily ideally situated to protect the atmosphere of the flask from the external atmosphere.

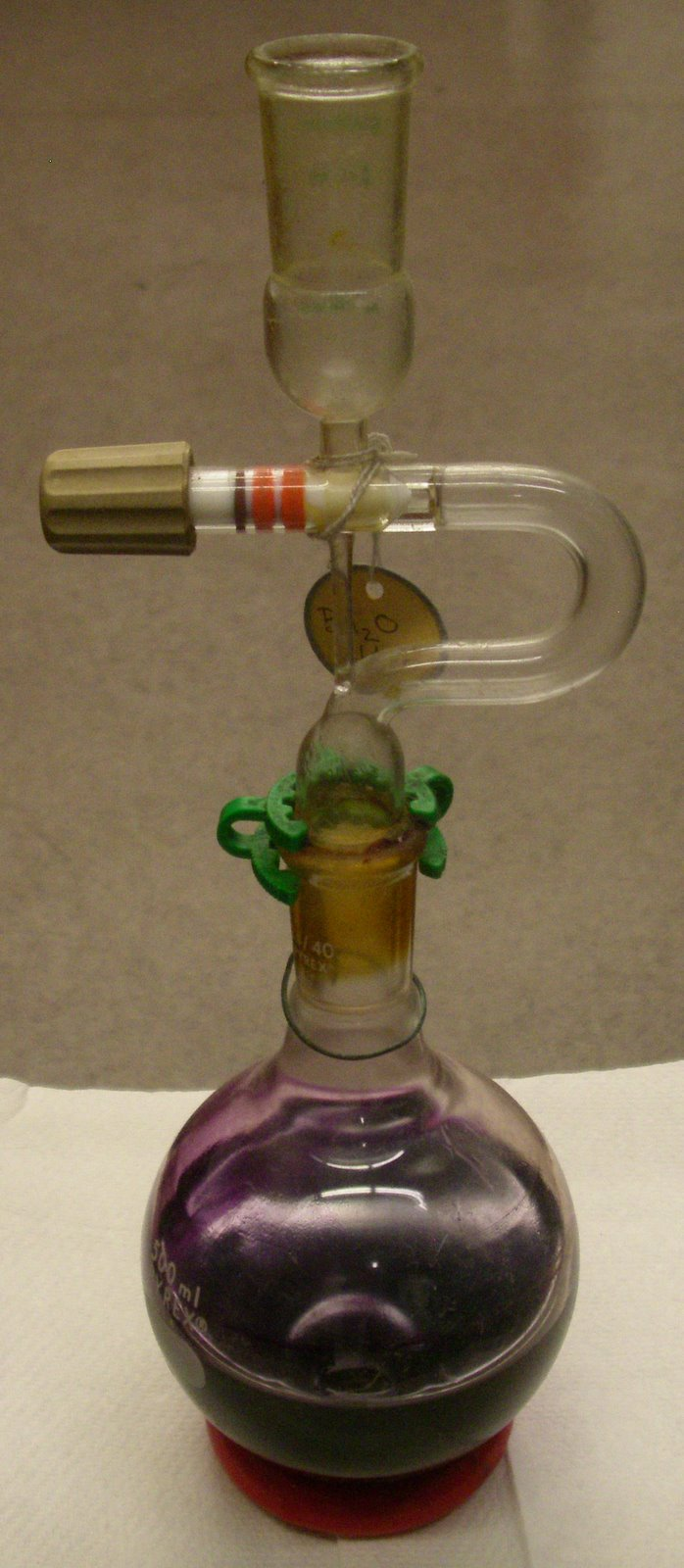
A solvent pot ready to have its dried and degassed contents vac transferred to another reaction vessel. This pot contains dibutyl ether dried over sodium and benzophenone, which gives it its purple color.

=== Solvent pot ===
Straus flasks are distinct from "solvent pots", which are flasks that contain a solvent as well as drying agents. Solvent pots are not usually bombs, or even Schlenk flasks in the classic sense. The most common configuration of a solvent pot is a simple round bottom flask attached to a 180° adapter fitted with some form of valve. The pot can be attached to a manifold and the contents distilled or vacuum transferred to other flasks free of soluble drying agents, water, oxygen or nitrogen. The term "solvent pot" can also refer to the flask containing the drying agents in a classic solvent still system. Due to fire risks, solvent stills have largely been replaced by solvent columns in which degassed solvent is forced through an insoluble drying agent before being collected. Solvent is usually collected from solvent columns through a needle connected to the column which pierces the septum of a flask or through a ground glass joint connected to the column, as in the case of a Straus flask.
