= Glovebox =

Sealed container with gloves in the side for manipulating the objects inside

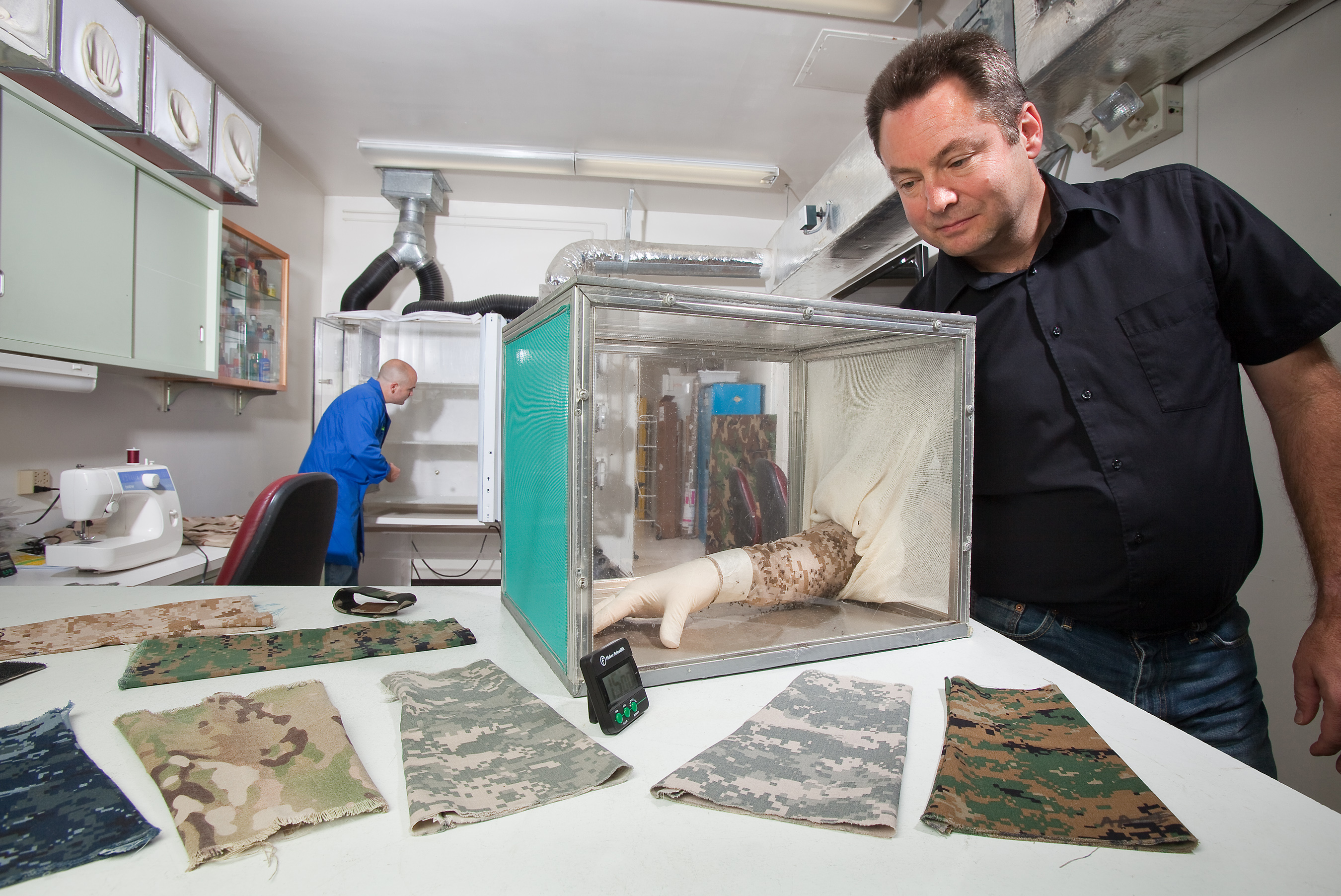
- A chemist tests a treated uniform to see whether it prevents mosquitoes from biting using a glovebox.
- Other names: Isolator
- Uses: Inert atmosphere work Hazardous materials work
- Related items: Desiccator; Schlenk line

A glovebox (or glove box) is a sealed container that is designed to allow one to manipulate objects where a separate atmosphere is desired. Built into the sides of the glovebox are gloves arranged in such a way that the user can place their hands into the gloves and perform tasks inside the box without breaking containment. Part or all of the box is usually transparent to allow the user to see what is being manipulated. A smaller antechamber compartment is used to transport items into or out of the main chamber without compromising the internal environment. Antechambers are much smaller than the main chambers so they can be exposed to ambient conditions more often and achieve inert conditions quickly.

Two types of gloveboxes exist. The first allows a person to work with hazardous substances, such as radioactive materials or infectious disease agents, and the second allows manipulation of substances that must be contained within a very high purity inert atmosphere, such as argon or nitrogen. It is also possible to use a glovebox for manipulation of items in a vacuum chamber.

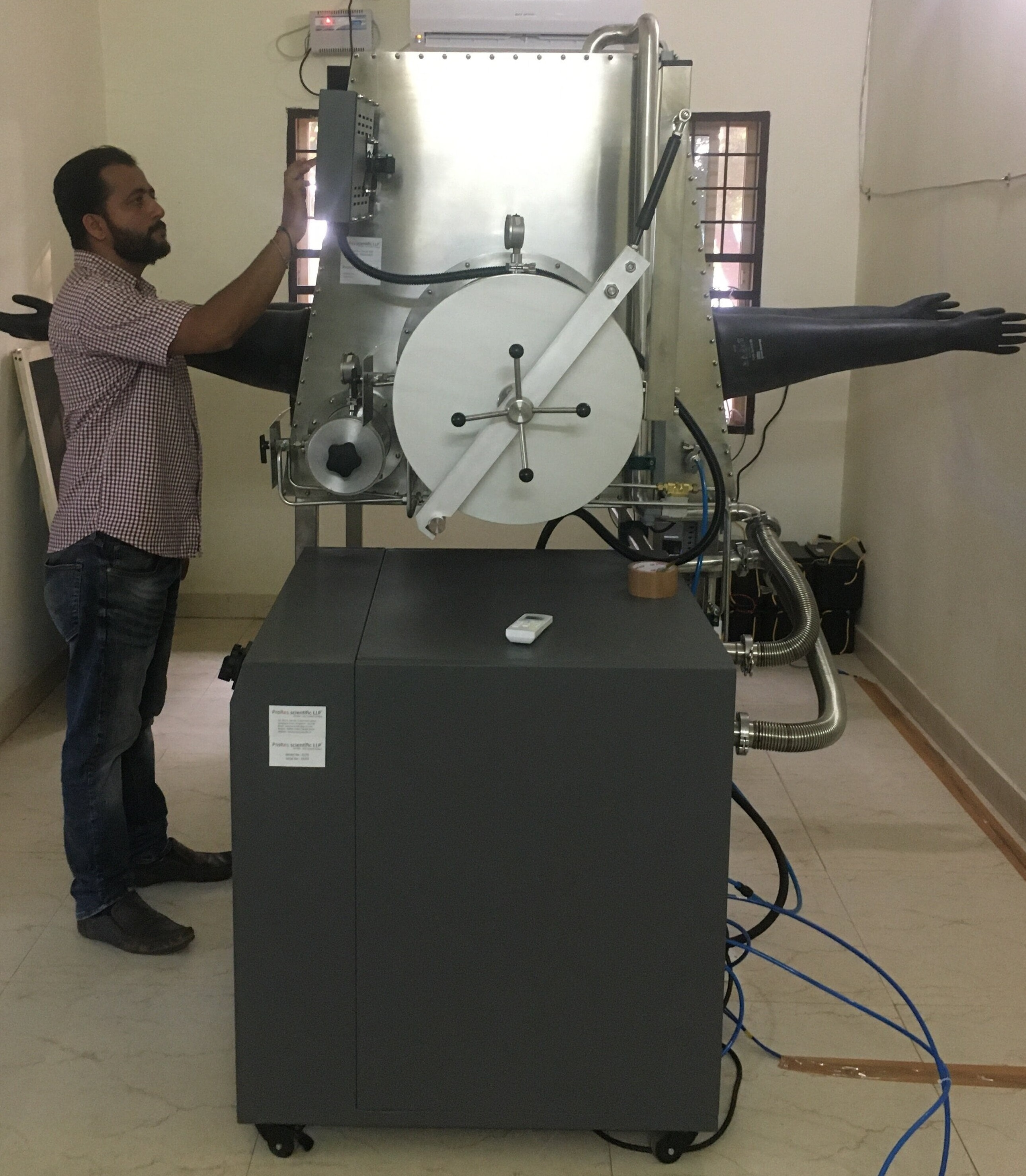
ProRes Glove box Dual Side operation

== Inert atmosphere work ==
An inert gas glovebox is a system that allows users to work in inert atmospheres. The gas in a glovebox is either provided from a pure source or is pumped through a series of treatment devices which remove solvents, water and oxygen from the gas. Copper metal (or some other finely divided metal) is commonly used to remove oxygen. This oxygen removing column is normally regenerated by passing a hydrogen/nitrogen mixture through it while it is heated. The water formed is passed out of the box with the excess hydrogen and nitrogen. It is common to use molecular sieves to remove water by absorbing it in the molecular sieves' pores. Such a box is often used by organometallic chemists to transfer dry solids from one container to another container.

An alternative to using a glovebox for air sensitive work is to employ Schlenk methods using a Schlenk line. One disadvantage of working in a glovebox is that organic solvents will attack the plastic seals. As a result, the box will start to leak and water and oxygen can then enter the box. Another disadvantage of a glovebox is that oxygen and water can diffuse through the plastic gloves. Also, coordinating solvents, such as tetrahydrofuran and dichloromethane, can bind irreversibly to the copper catalyst, reducing its effectiveness. One way to prolong the lifespan of the glovebox and catalyst is to turn off circulation when using solvents, followed by purging when work involving solvents is finished.

Inert atmosphere gloveboxes are typically kept at a higher pressure than the surrounding air, so that any microscopic leaks are mostly leaking inert gas out of the box instead of letting air in. There are now open source hardware plans for medium performance inert gas glove boxes (e.g., able to reduce oxygen to <20ppm).

== Hazardous materials work ==
At the now-deactivated Rocky Flats Plant, which manufactured plutonium triggers, also called "pits", production facilities consisted of linked stainless steel gloveboxes up to 64 feet, or 20 meters, in length, which contained the equipment which forged and machined the trigger parts. The gloves were lead-lined. Other materials used in the gloveboxes included acrylic viewing windows and Benelex shielding composed of wood fiber and plastic which shielded against neutron radiation. Manipulation of the lead-lined gloves was onerous work.

Some gloveboxes for radioactive work are under inert conditions, for instance, one nitrogen-filled box contains an argon-filled box. The argon box is fitted with a gas treatment system to keep the gas very pure to enable electrochemical experiments in molten salts.

Gloveboxes are also used in the biological sciences when dealing with anaerobes or high-biosafety level pathogens.

Gloveboxes used for hazardous materials are generally maintained at a lower pressure than the surrounding atmosphere, so that microscopic leaks result in air intake rather than hazard outflow. Gloveboxes used for hazardous materials generally incorporate HEPA filters into the exhaust, to keep the hazard contained.

== Gallery ==
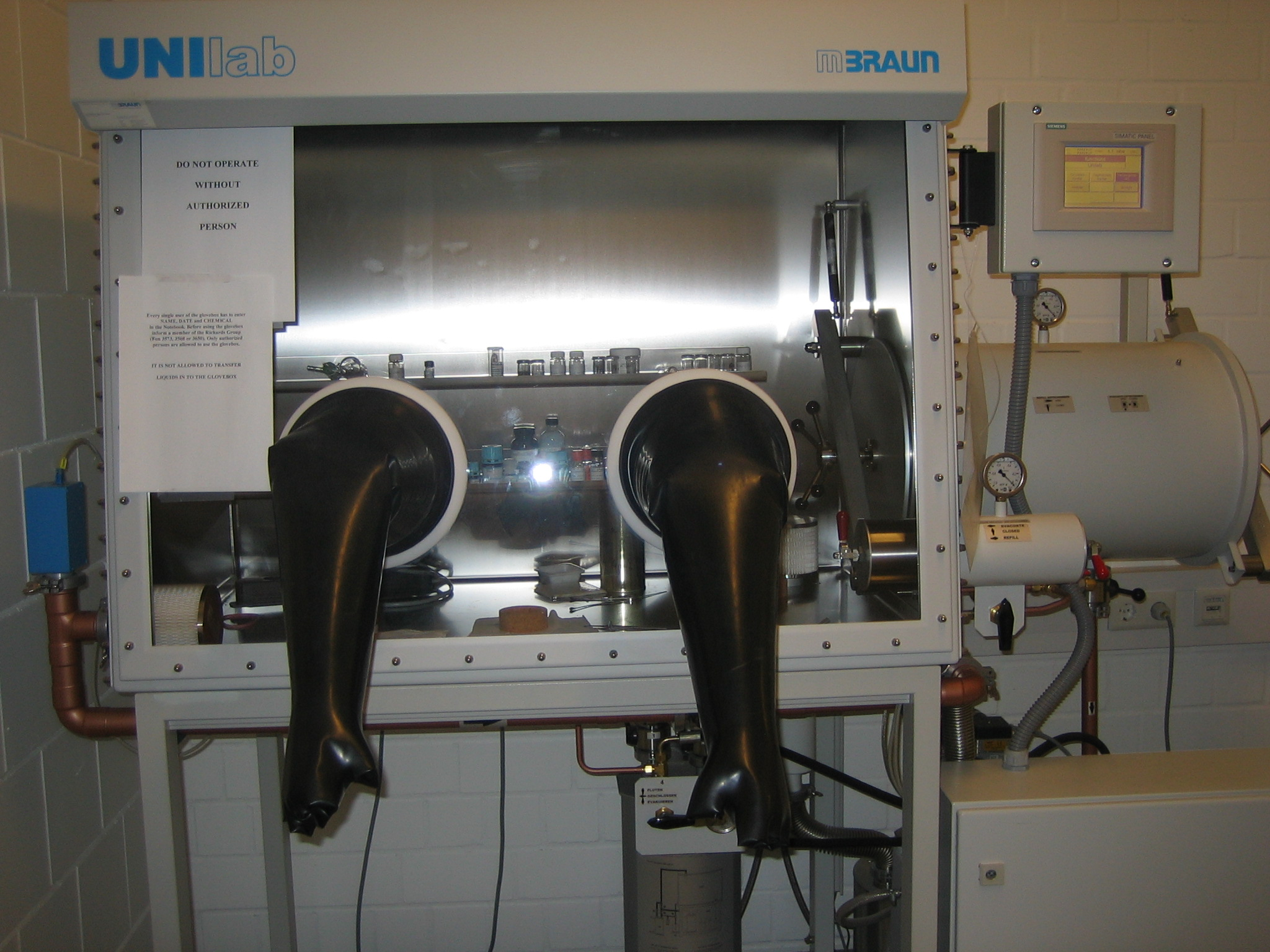
An ordinary glovebox, showing the two gloves for manipulation, with airlock on the right

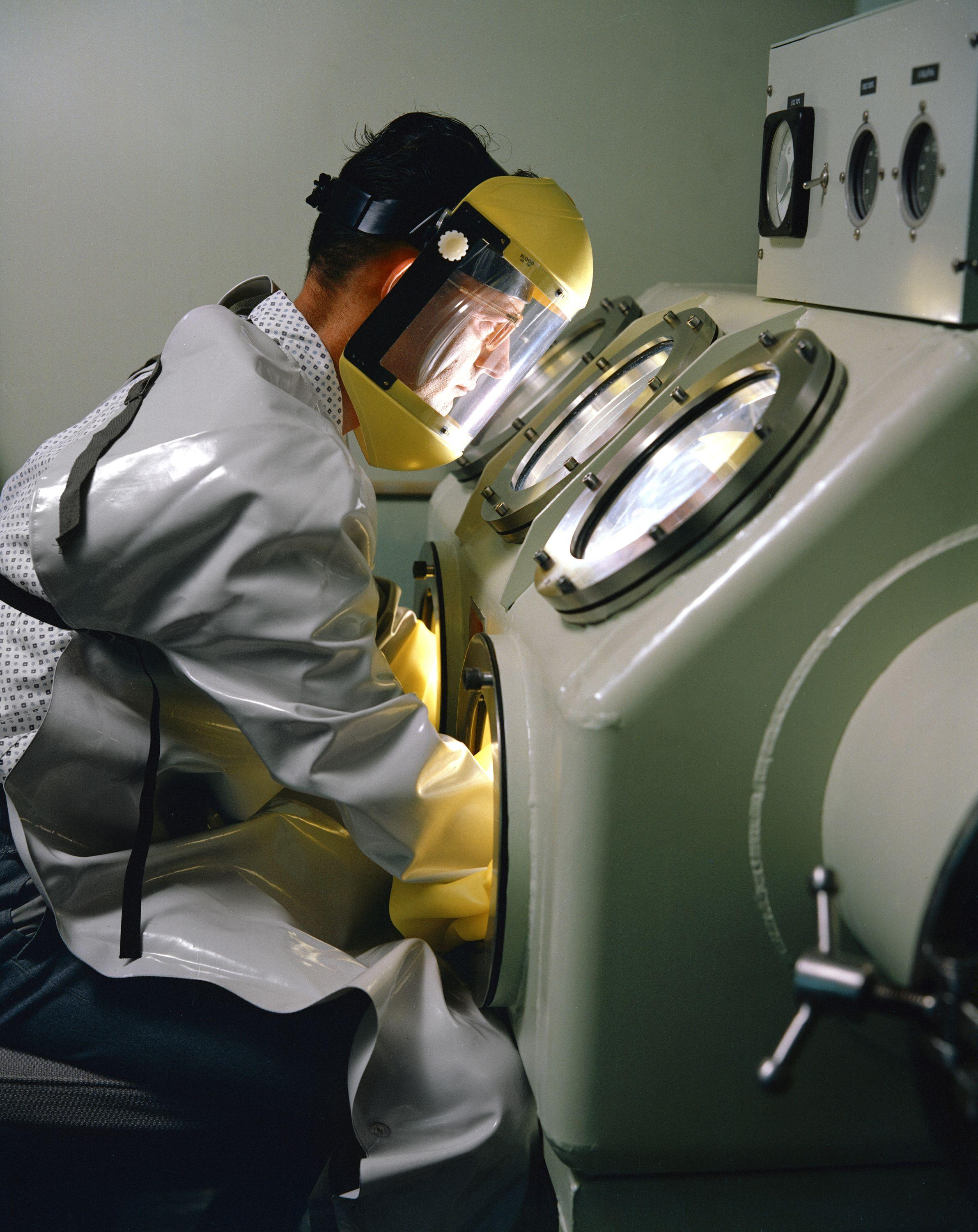
Metal glovebox for handling dangerous substances in vacuum, with extra protection against explosions or implosions

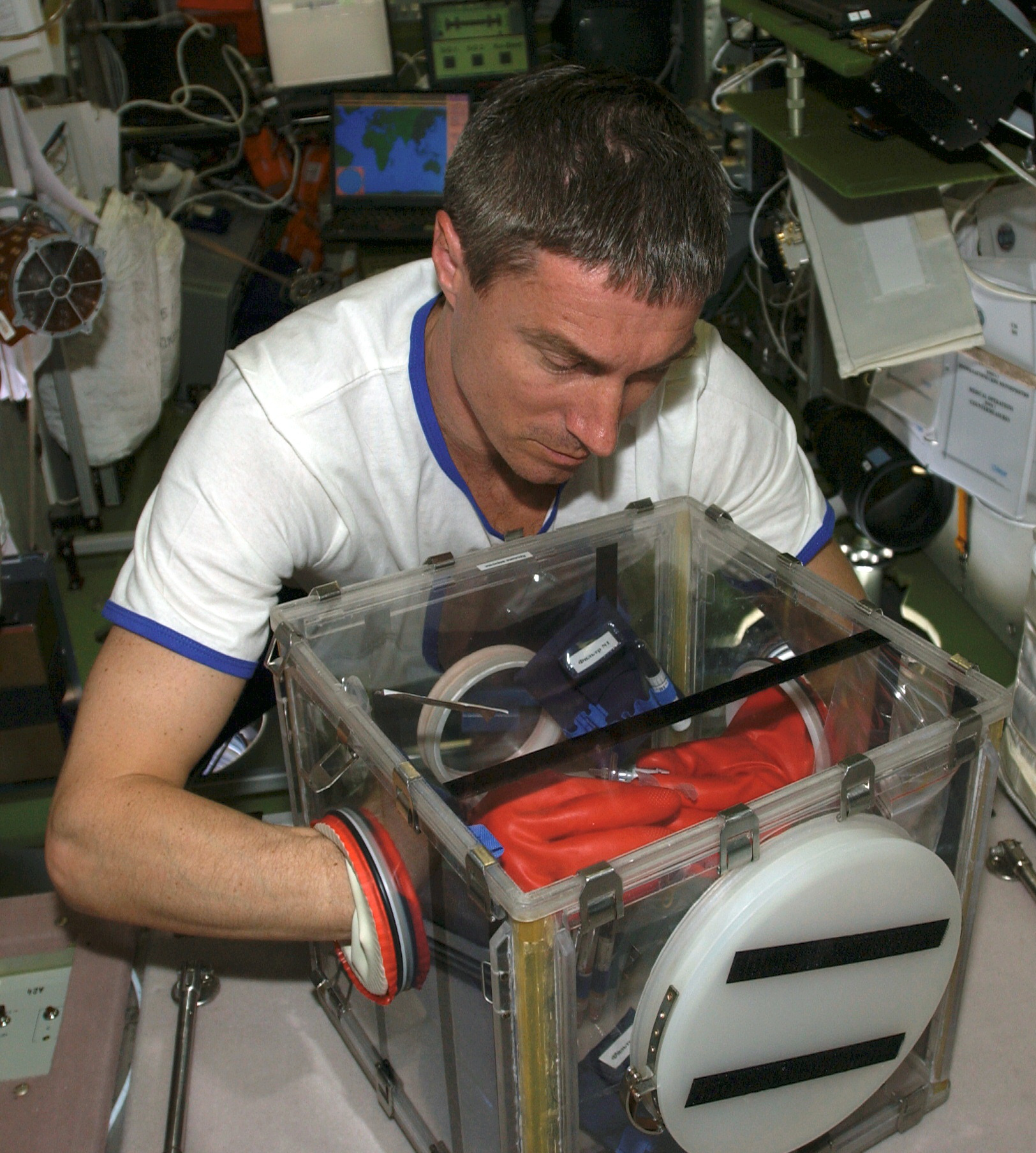
Sergei Krikalev working with a portable glovebox at the International Space Station

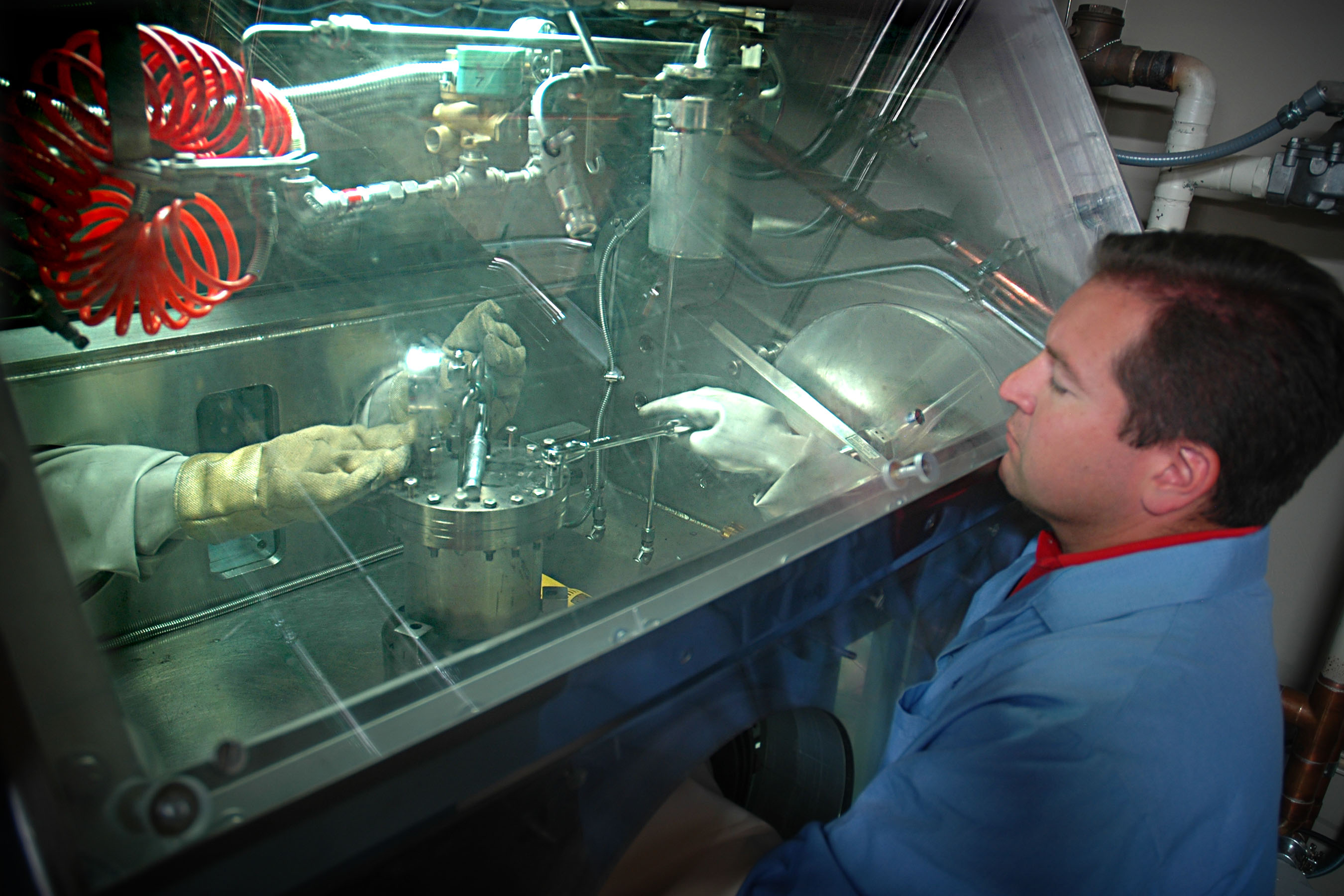
Multiple-port glovebox allowing access by several operators from different sides

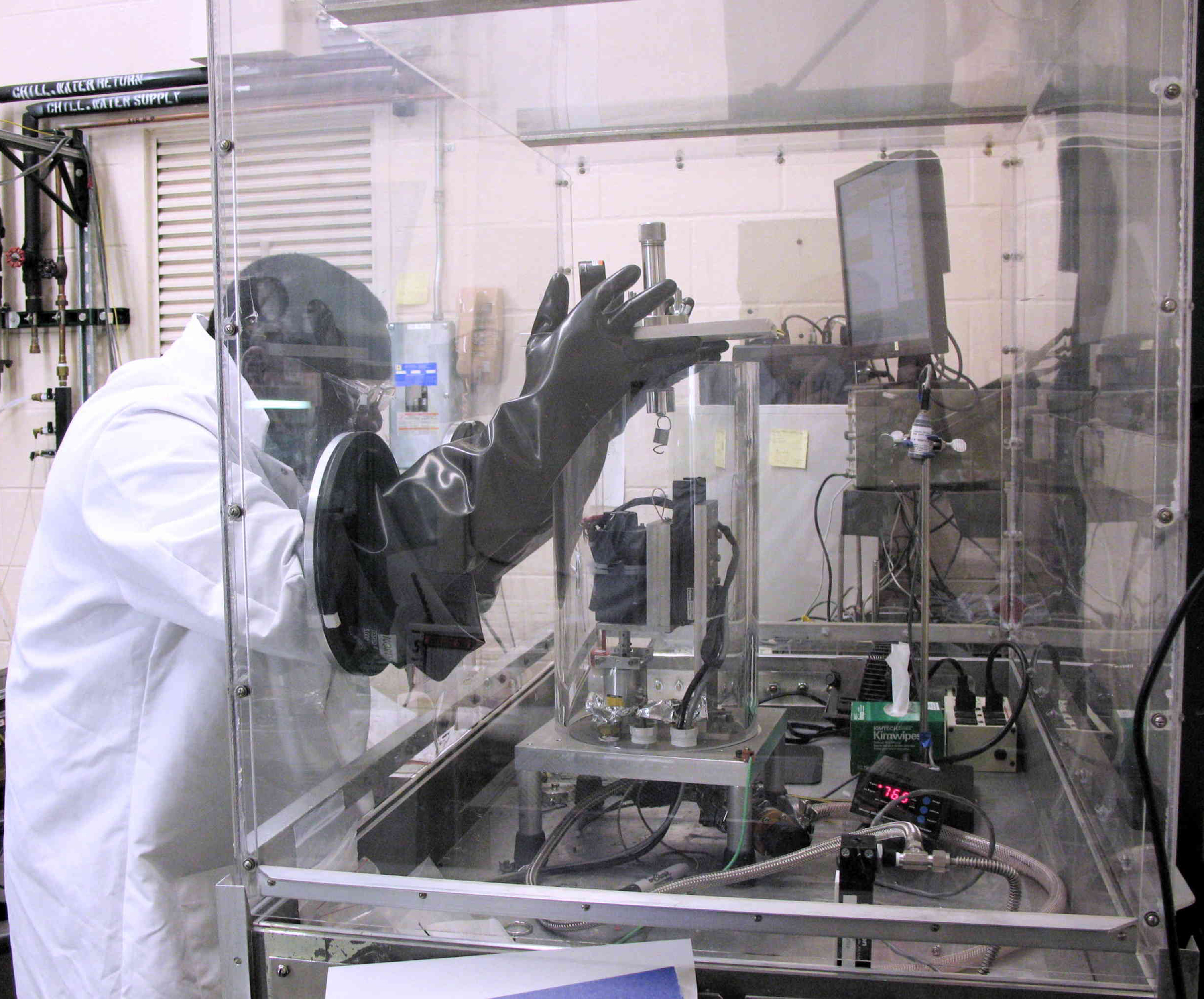
A glovebox-like shield built around an experimental setup

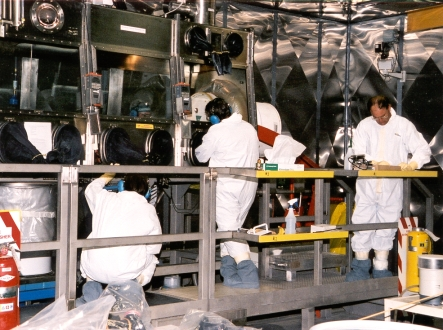
Large scale glovebox in the nuclear industry

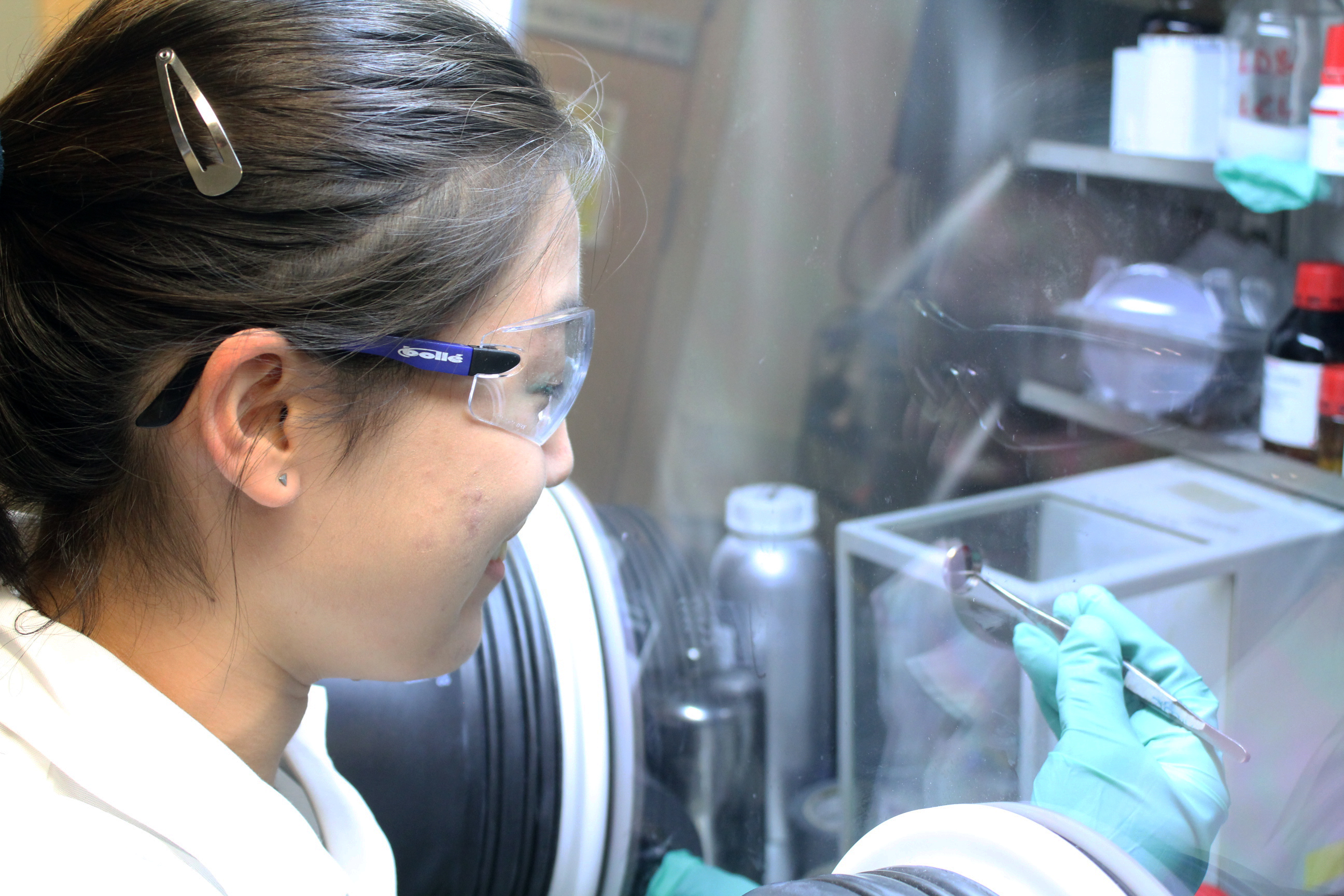
A scientist in UCL Chemical Engineering uses a glovebox to manipulate a sample

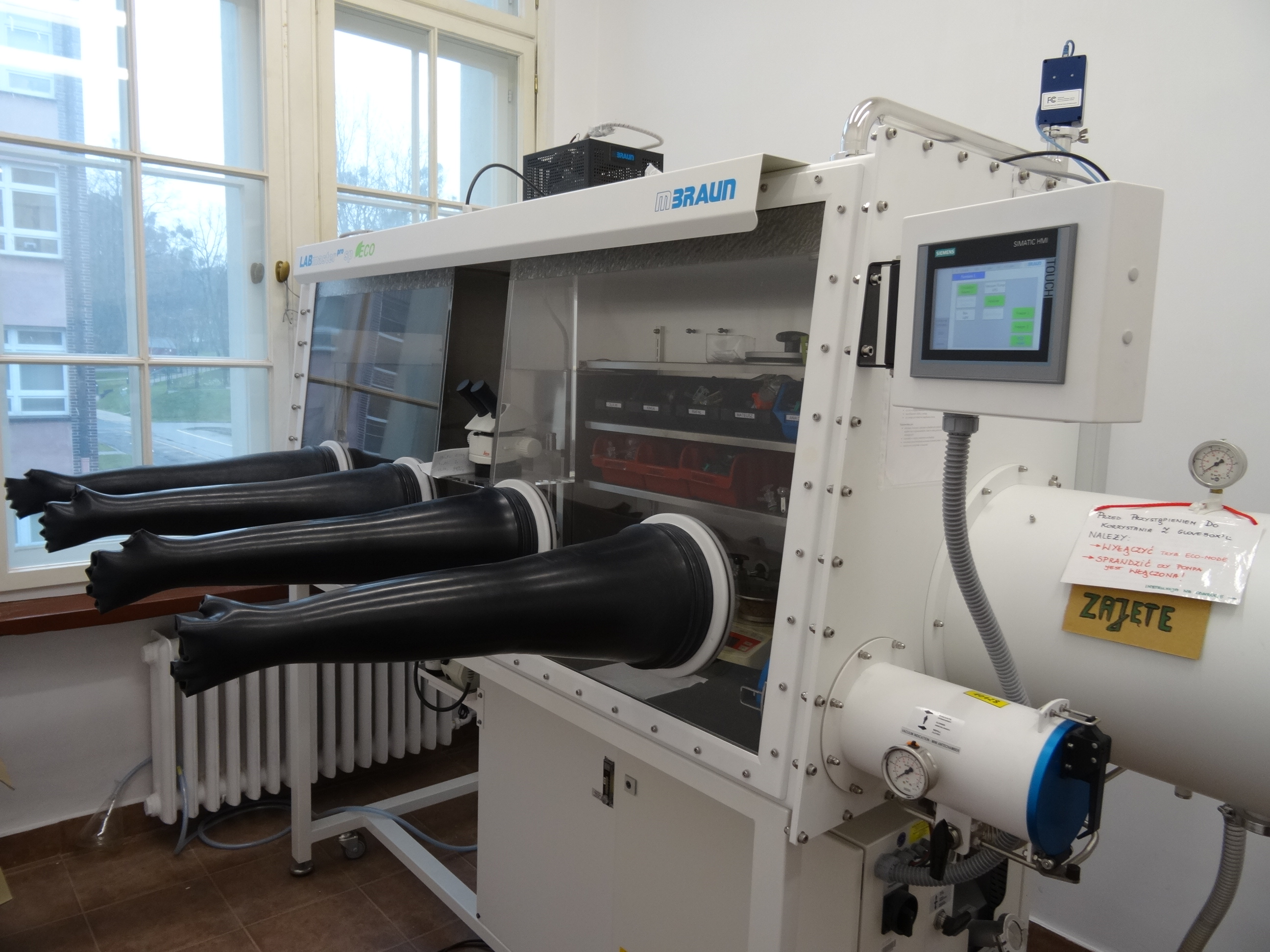
Glovebox with microscope and airlock

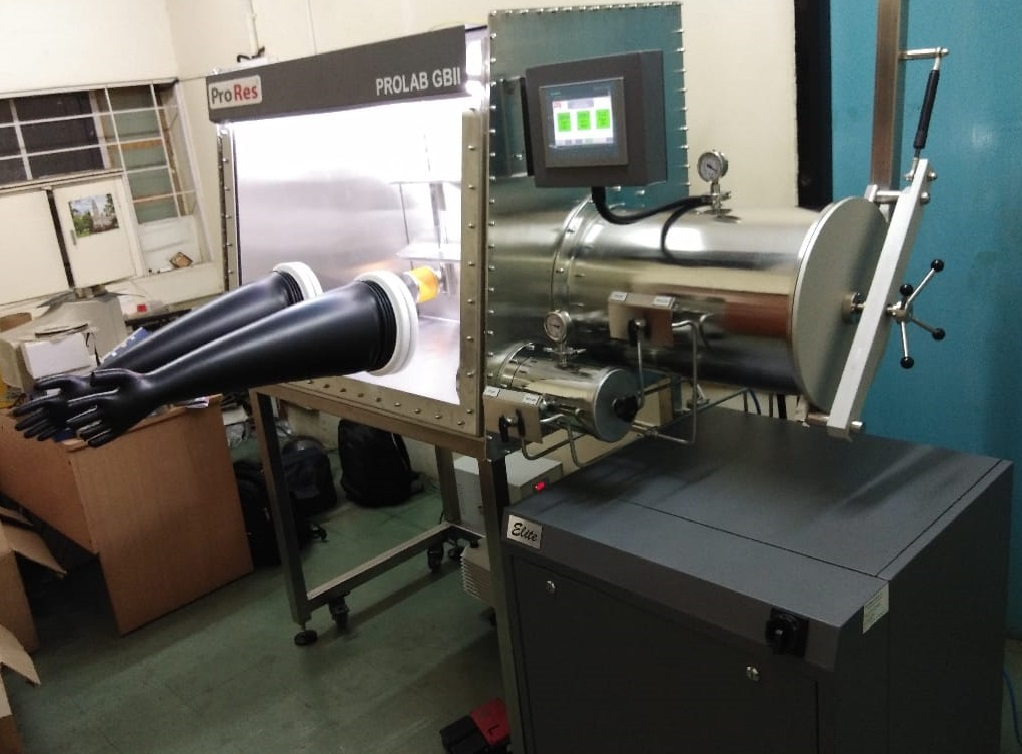
Nano Material handling glove box

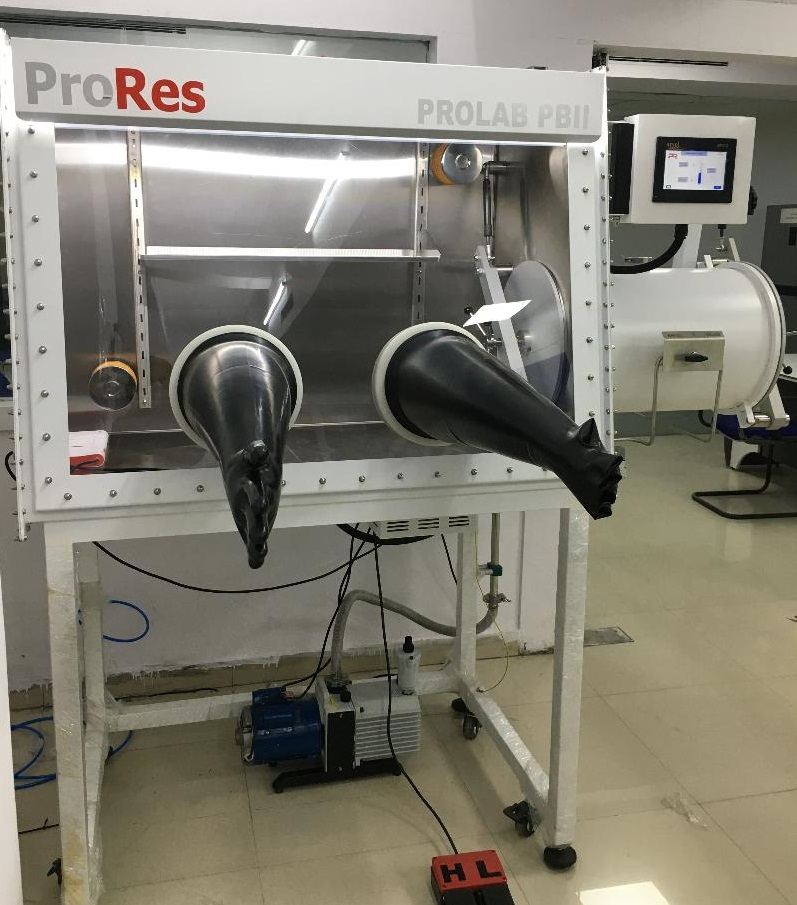
Inert glovebox using for pharmaceutical application (hygroscopic samples weighing and packing)

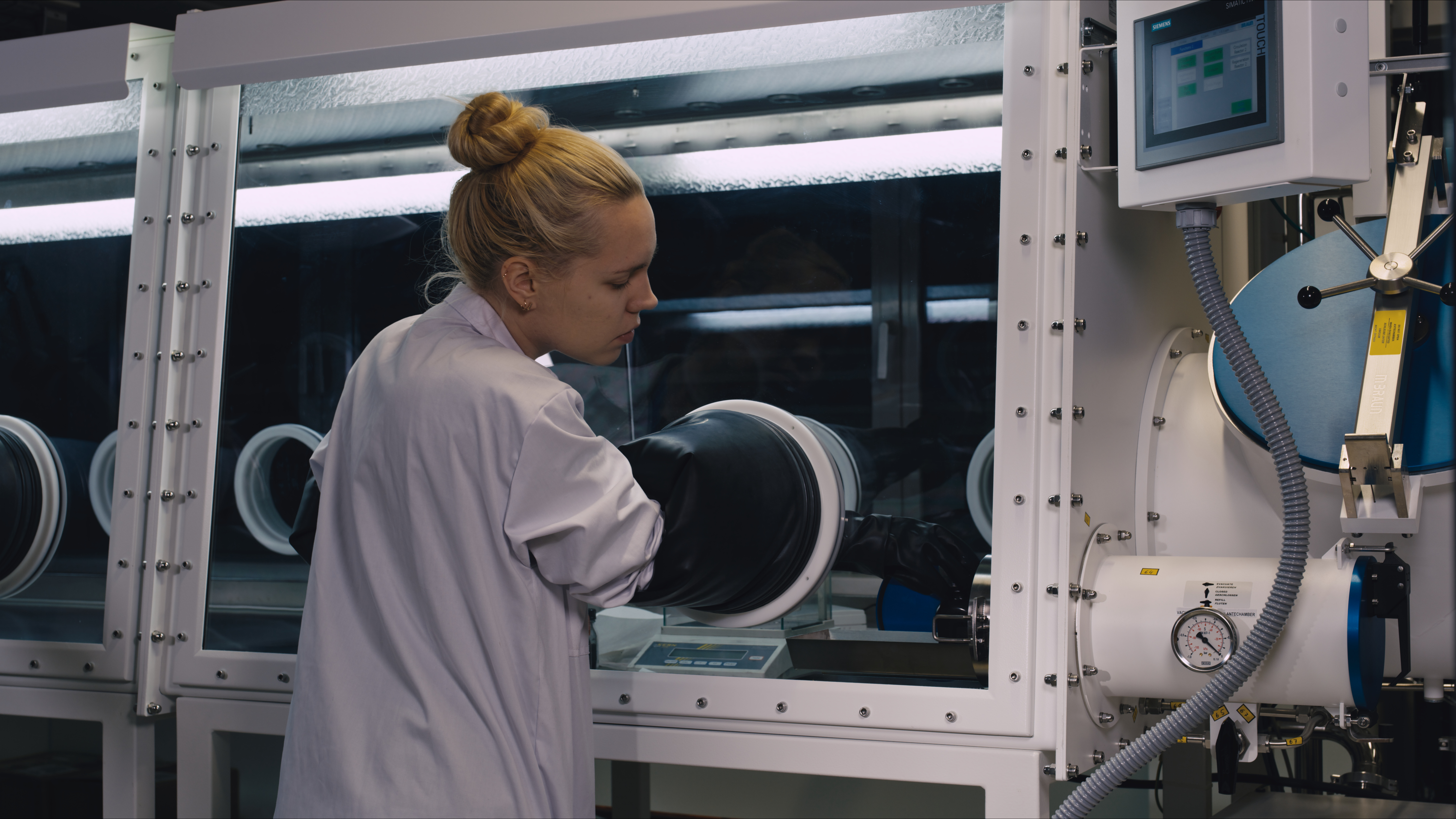
Supercapacitor test cell assembly in an argon dry chamber. Modern supercapacitors work with an organic electrolyte that must be protected from moisture. Therefore, the supercapacitor was filled with electrolyte in a dry chamber in high purity argon environment

== See also ==
- Desiccators are used for storing chemicals which are moisture-sensitive, but do not react quickly or violently with water.
- Fume hoods are used for hazardous material handling where less operator protection and the same atmosphere can be used.
- Hot cells often use remote manipulators to provide radiological containment where more operator protection is required.
- Sandblasting cabinets are a type of glovebox which shield the user from the high-velocity abrasive particles inside.
- Schlenk lines are used for manipulating oxygen- and moisture-sensitive chemicals.
