= Stopcock =

Valve used to control the flow of a liquid or gas

Example of symbol for a stop valve

A stopcock is a form of valve used to control the flow of a liquid or gas. The term is not precise and is applied to many different types of valve. The only consistent attribute is that the valve is designed to completely stop the flow when closed fully.

== Use ==
=== Water service ===
Stopcocks are used to regulate the flow of water in residential and commercial properties. Often, one is found at the junction of a water main and the branch leading to a property (allowing the service to the property to be isolated from the mains), and another is positioned inside so the water supply service can be turned off where it enters a dwelling or unit. Controlling the supply is often done when maintenance or repairs are necessary. There are different types of stopcock, such as ball-valve, tapered plug and gate valve. Most work by turning a component in a particular direction to either turn the supply on or off. Inside a property, the stopcock is not always located in the same place.

=== Medical ===
Stopcocks are often used in medicine as a component of apparatus used in procedures such as intracranial pressure monitoring and also in other procedures where varying amounts of liquid must be released without direct use of a syringe.

=== Laboratory ===
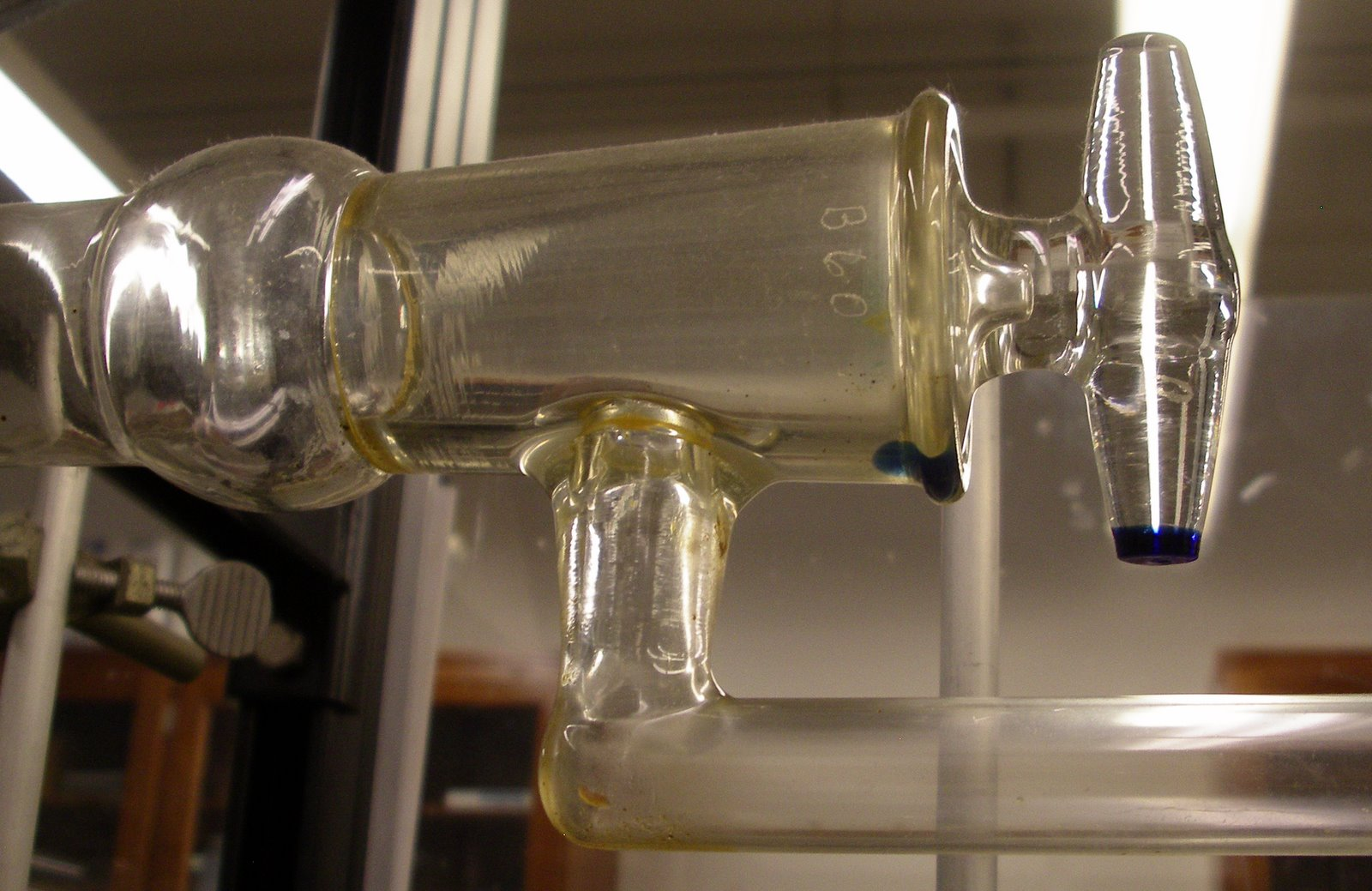
A single hole hollow glass stopcock held in place by vacuum

For laboratory glassware, items sometimes have plug valves with conically-tapered inserts called stopcocks (sometimes referred to as "plugs" by laypeople) with different bores. The valve bodies are usually made of glass, while the plugs are made of glass or Teflon. One can also find valves with a Teflon spindle (for example one way valves or angled valves). When the plug is made of glass, the handle and plug are fused together in one piece. When both the valve body and the plug are made of glass, a suitable grease (e.g. silicone grease or Ramsay grease) is usually used to create a good seal, as well as to prevent the valve from seizing and subsequently cracking.

Special stopcocks are available, such as a double-oblique or three-way design used in Schlenk lines which permit the application of inert gas and vacuum from the same stopcock.

Stopcocks are often parts of laboratory glassware such as burettes, separatory funnels, Schlenk flasks, and columns used for column chromatography. The stopcock is a smooth tampered plug or rotor with a handle, which fits into a corresponding ground glass female joint. The stationary female joint is designed so it joins two or more pieces of glass tubing. The stopcock has holes bored through it which allow the tubes attached to the female joint to be connected or separated with partial turns of the stopcock. Most stopcocks are solid pieces with linear bores although some are hollow. The stopcock is held together with the female joint via a metal spring, plastic plug retainer, or a washer and nut system. Stopcock plugs are generally made out of ground glass but can also be made with an inert plastic like PTFE.

Stopcocks are generally available individually with some length of glass tubing at the ports so that they can be joined by a glass blower into custom apparatus at the point of use. This is especially common for the large glass manifolds used in high vacuum lines. Many additional variations exist in both plug boring and joint assembly. Stopcocks have been manufactured for laboratory use since at least the start of the 20th century.

==== Types of laboratory stopcocks ====
- One-, two- and three-way stopcocks
- Needle valve stopcocks straight or right-angled
- Burette stopcocks straight or lateral
- Desiccator stopcocks
- Vacuum stopcocks one-way straight or parallel, one-way right-angled or 2-way

== Gallery ==
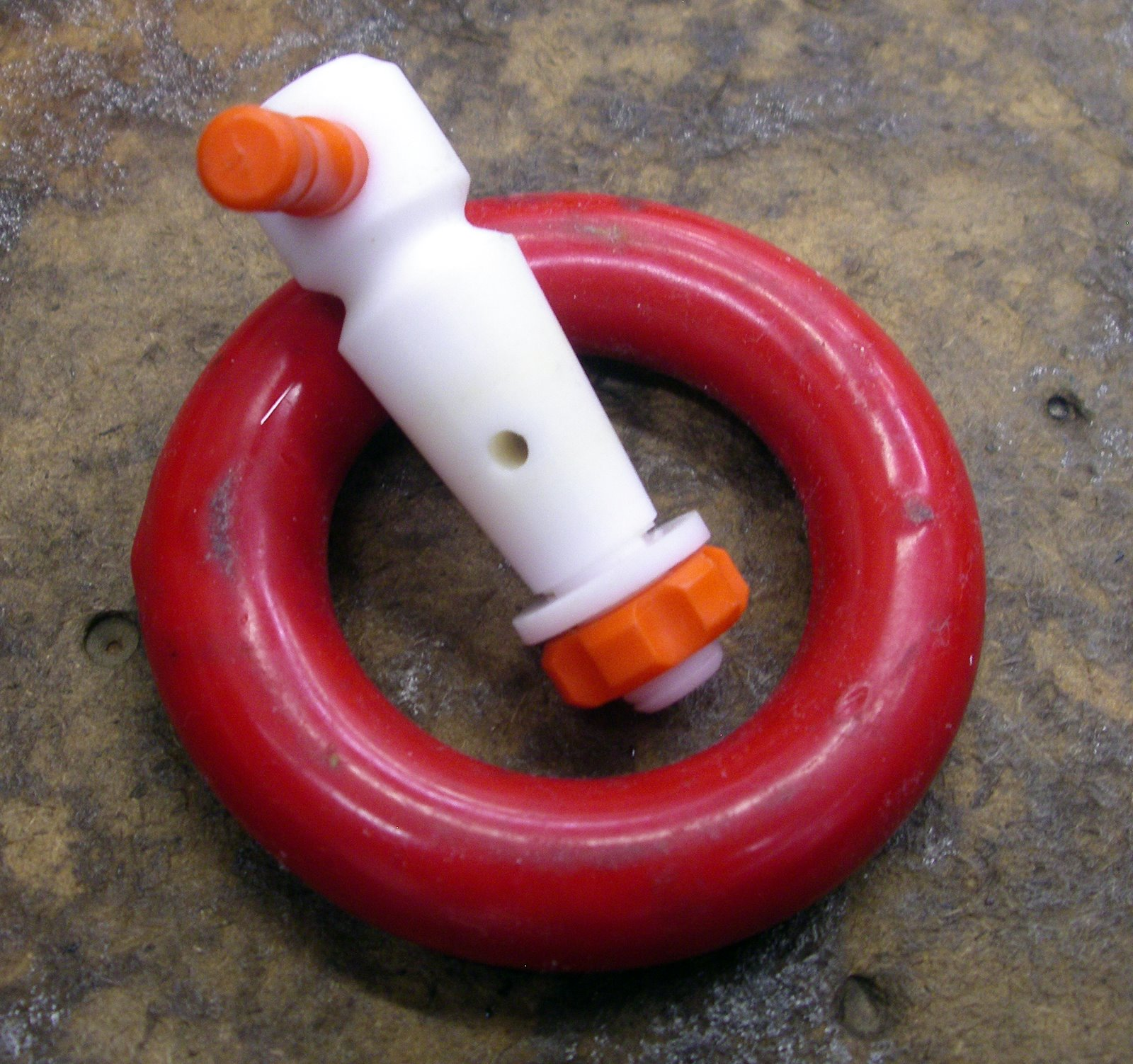
A straight bore plastic stopcock without the female joint. Note its washer and nut system for attaching to its female joint.

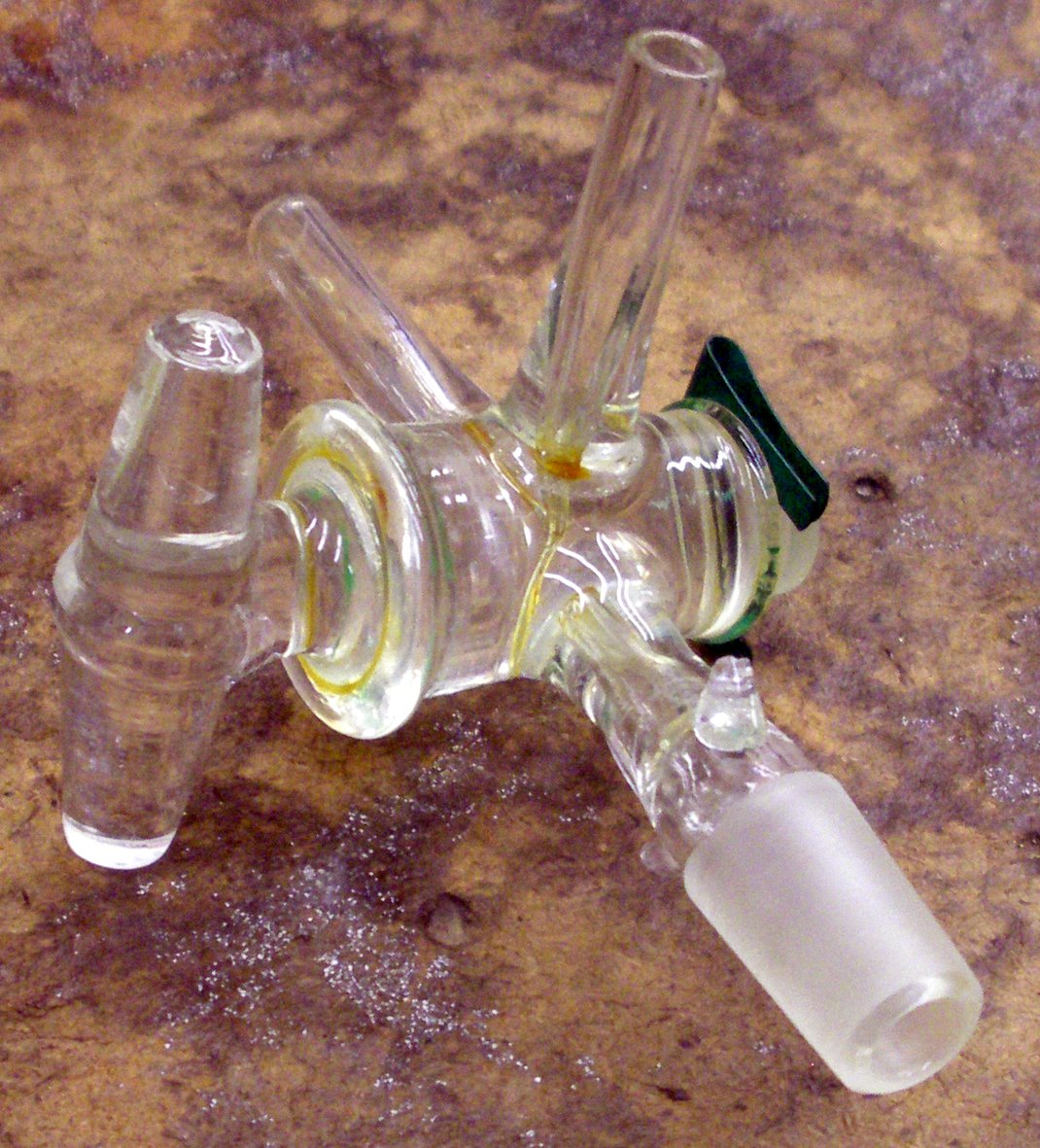
A T-bore glass stopcock in a three-way assembly. Two of the outlets end in plain hose adapters while the third ends in a male 14/20 ground glass joint. This stopcock is attached with an easily removed metal spring.

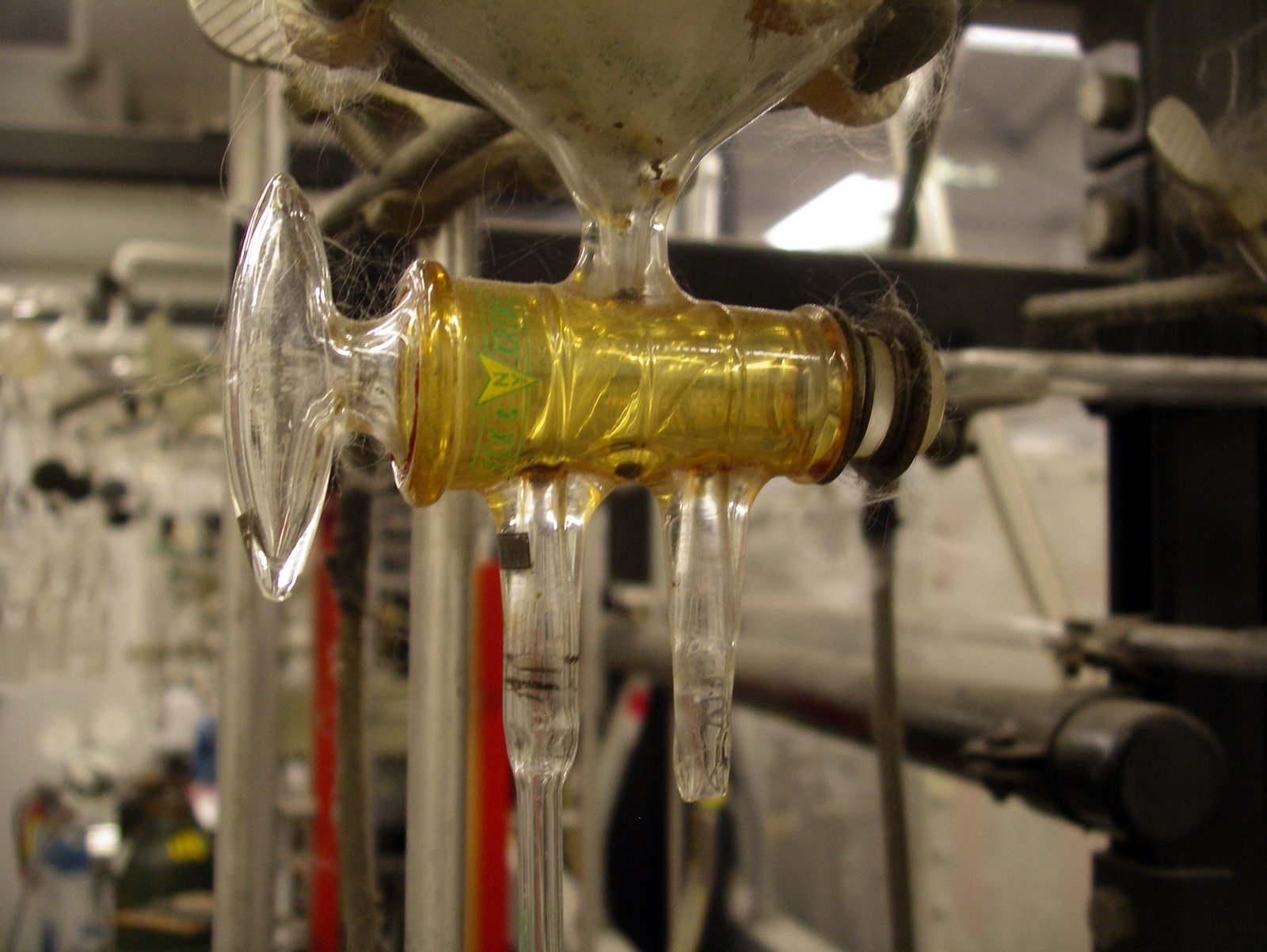
A double oblique bore glass three-way stopcock.

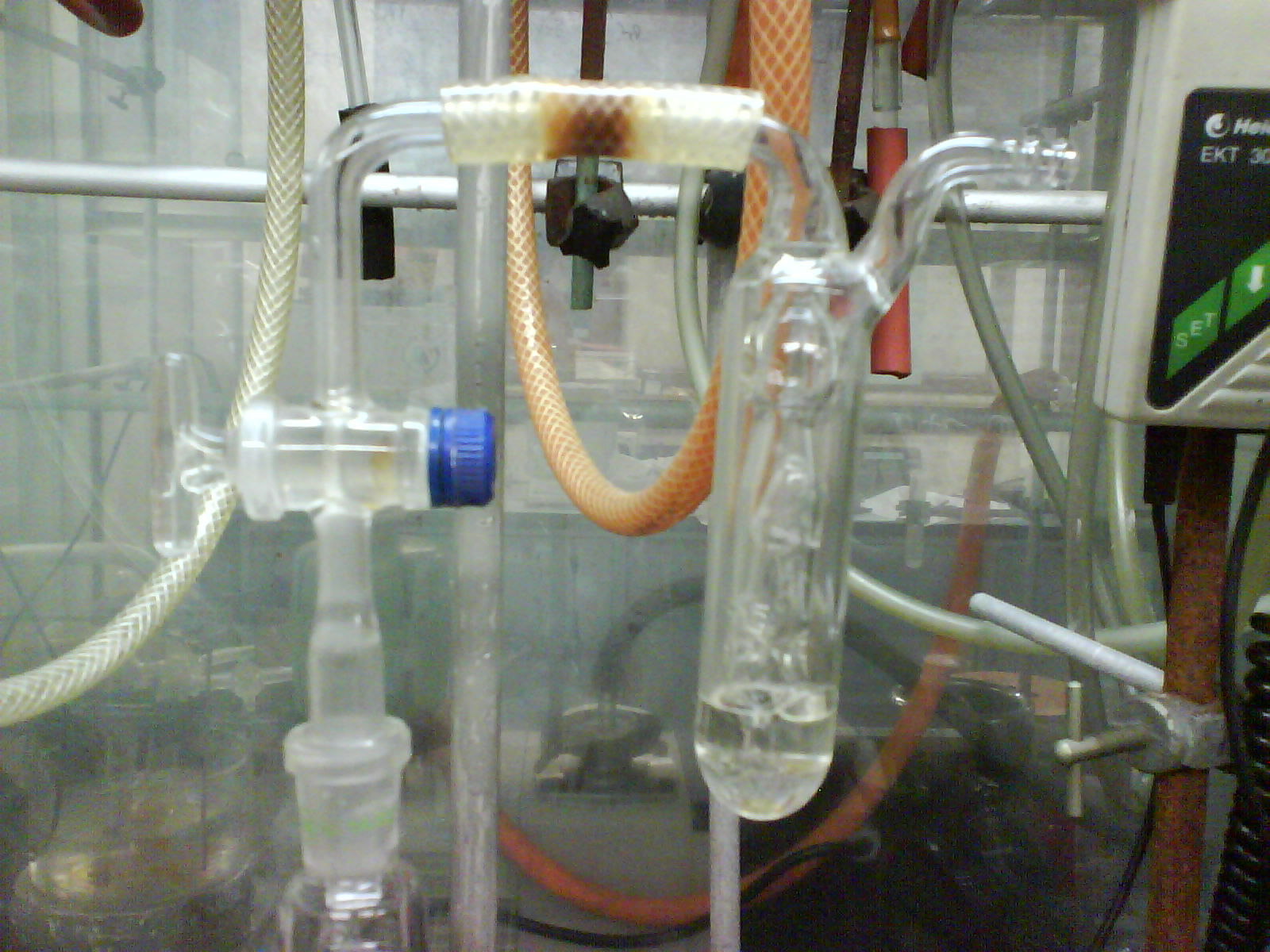
A stopcock in the open position, connected to the oil bubbler via a short hose.

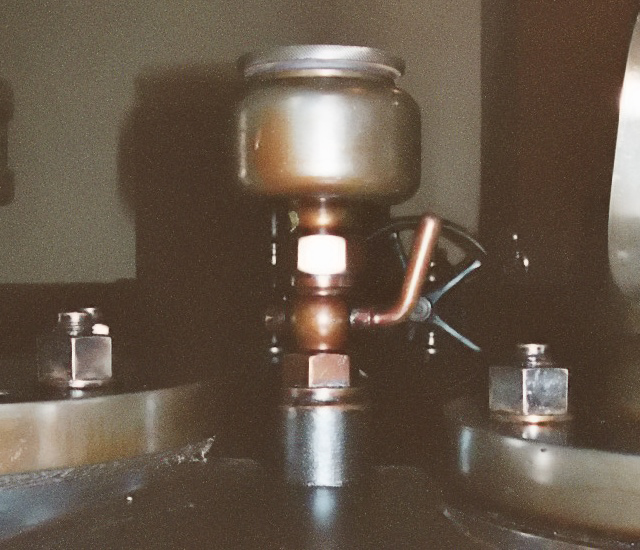
A stopcock on a steam engine.

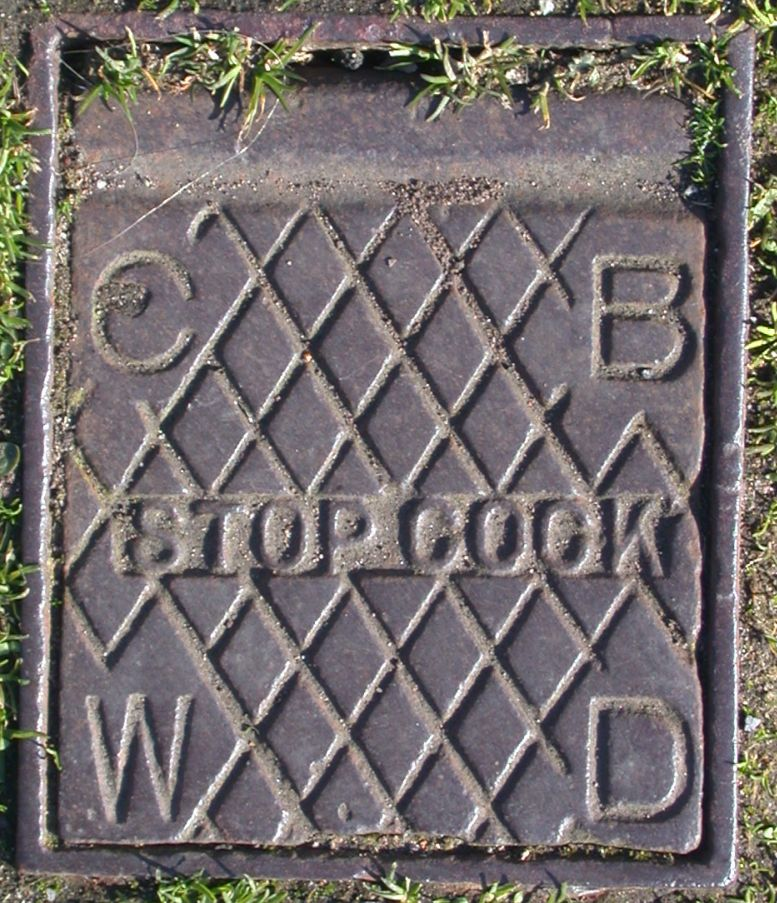
A cast-iron City of Birmingham stopcock cover, on the boundary of a residential property, from the time when the City Council was responsible for the supply of drinking water.
