= Quickfit apparatus =

Brand of laboratory glassware

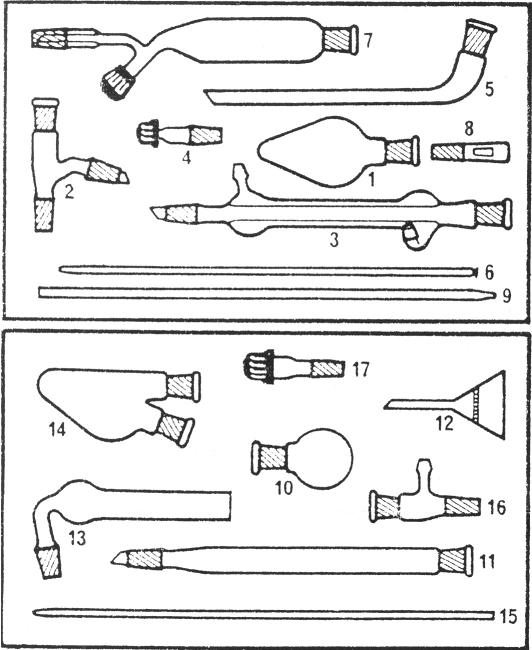
Common Quickfit components include (1) Pear shaped flask, 50 ml (2) Stillhead (3) Liebig condenser (4) Screwcap adapter (5) Receiver adapter (6) Thermometer (7) Dropping funnel, 50 ml, with Rotaflo tap (8) Stopper (9) Air leak / steam inlet tube (10) Round bottom flask, 25 ml (11) Air condenser / drying tube (12) Sintered glass funnel (13) Drying tube (14) Pear shaped flask, 50 ml, with angled side neck (15) Air leak / steam inlet tube (16) Adapter with 'T' connection (17) Screwcap adapter

Quickfit is a brand of laboratory glassware, produced under the Pyrex trademark and distributed through various fronts in differing countries; e.g. Corning in North America. A large percentage of the glassware makes use of ground glass joints.

The Quickfit brand is blown in Stone, Staffordshire, in the United Kingdom and marketed through DWK in the United Kingdom. 'Quickfit' has become a genericized trademark for all ground glass. Whilst the ownership and name of Quickfit has changed numerous times, all genuine Quickfit glass is stamped with a Q, displaying the brand name, the word Pyrex and the part code.

== Timeline ==
1923, James A. Jobling licensed to produce Pyrex branded glassware

1962, Quartz and Quickfit glassware goes into production at Stone

1970, Quickfit becomes a part of Jobling Lab Division

1973, Quickfit joins the Corning company

1982, Corning Laboratory Division becomes J.Bibby Science Products

1986, J Bibby Scientific Products becomes Bibby Sterilin

2005, Bibby Sterilin becomes Barloworld Scientific

2008, SciLabware is introduced

2011, Scilabware becomes part of the Duran Group

2015, Duran Group acquires & integrates WHEATON Industries Inc

2016, UK entities of WHEATON & SciLabware consolidate into new SciLabware

2017, Launch of DWK Life Sciences, SciLabware launches new branding

2020, SciLabware Ltd becomes DWK Life Sciences Limited
