= Fernbach =

Fernbach is a surname. Notable people with the surname include:

- Anton Fernbach-Ferenczi (also known as Antal Ferenczi) (1925–1989), Romanian footballer and football manager
- Auguste Fernbach (1860-1939), French biologist
- C. W. Fernbach (1915–1967), Austrian actor
- Franz Xaver Fernbach, politician
- Henry Fernbach (1829—1883), American architect
- Johannes Fehring, originally Fernbach (1926–2004), Austrian jazz-musician
- Sidney Fernbach (1917-1991), American physicist

== See also ==
- Fernbach flask
- Sidney Fernbach Award
