= Round-bottom flask =

Laboratory equipment

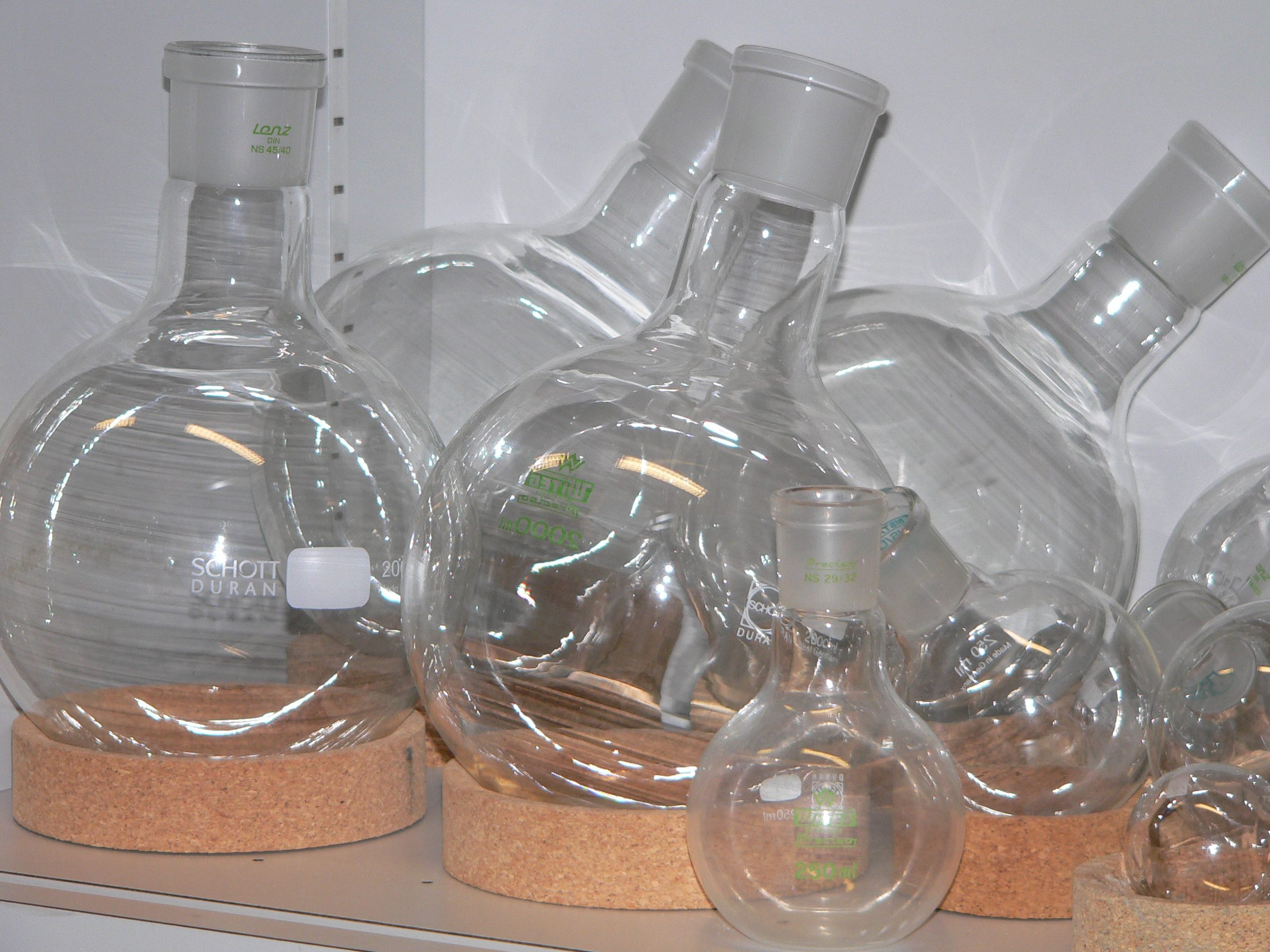
Round-bottom flasks and cork rings

Laboratory distillation set-up using a Liebig condenser, without a fractionating column. Both distilling (2, left) and receiving (8, right) flasks are round-bottom flasks.

Round-bottom flasks (also called round-bottomed flasks or RB flasks) are types of flasks having spherical bottoms used as laboratory glassware, mostly for chemical or biochemical work. They are typically made of glass for chemical inertness; and in modern days, they are usually made of heat-resistant borosilicate glass. There is at least one tubular section known as the neck with an opening at the tip. Two- or three-necked flasks are common as well. Round bottom flasks come in many sizes, from 5 mL to 20 L, with the sizes usually inscribed on the glass. In pilot plants even larger flasks are encountered.

The ends of the necks are usually conical ground glass joints. These are standardized, and can accept any similarly-sized tapered (male) fittings. 24/40 is common for 250 mL or larger flasks, while smaller sizes such as 14/20 or 19/22 are used for smaller flasks.

Because of the round bottom, cork rings are needed to keep the round bottom flasks upright. When in use, round-bottom flasks are commonly held at the neck by clamps on a stand.

A round-bottom flask is featured prominently on the logo of the OPCW, the implementing body for the Chemical Weapons Convention.

== Uses ==
- Heating and/or boiling of liquid.
- Distillation.
- Contain chemical reactions.
- Distilling flask in Rotary evaporators.
- Storage of the culture media.
- Preparation of gas-phase standards for flasks fitted with septa (requires volumetric calibration)

The round bottoms on these types of flasks allow more uniform heating and/or boiling of liquid. Thus, round-bottom flasks are used in a variety of applications where the contents are heated or boiled. Round-bottom flasks are used in distillation by chemists as distilling flasks and receiving flasks for the distillate (see distillation diagram). One-neck round-bottom flasks are used as the distilling flasks in rotary evaporators.

This flask shape is also more resistant to fracturing under vacuum, as a sphere more evenly distributes stress across its surface.

Round-bottom flasks are often used to contain chemical reactions run by chemists, especially for reflux set-ups and laboratory-scale synthesis. Boiling chips are added in distilling flasks for distillations or boiling chemical reactions to allow a nucleation site for gradual boiling. This nucleation avoids a sudden boiling surge where the contents may overflow from the boiling flask. Stirring bars or other stirring devices suited for round-bottom flasks are sometimes used. Round bottom flasks suffer from poor stirring when compared with Erlenmeyer flasks, as they can't accept large stir bars and material can become trapped at the base. For a reflux set-up, a condenser is typically attached to the middle or only neck of the flask being used. Additional necks on a flask could allow a thermometer or a mechanical stirrer to be inserted into the flask contents. The additional necks can also allow a dropping funnel to be attached to let reactants slowly drip in.

Special electrically powered heating mantles are available in various sizes into which the bottoms of round-bottom flasks can fit so that the contents of a flask can be heated for distillation, chemical reactions, boiling, etc. Heating can also be accomplished by submerging the bottom of the flask into a heat bath, water bath, or sand bath. Similarly cooling can be accomplished by partial submerging into a cooling bath, filled with e.g. cold water, ice, eutectic mixtures, dry ice/solvent mixtures, or liquid nitrogen. For gas preparation where heating is required. Since the flask is round bottomed heat is uniformly distributed throughout on heating.

== Related glassware ==
- Flat-bottomed flask: A flask with similar uses as the round-bottom flask, but with a flat bottom that allows it to stand on a level surface.
- Florence flask: A flask similar to the flat-bottomed flask that has round bodies and either a round bottom or a flat bottom so that one can stand the flask on a level surface. Florence flasks typically have one neck which is longer and may be somewhat wider than the usual neck of a round bottom flask. The necks of traditional Florence flasks often do not have a ground glass joint like modern round bottom flasks do. Round-bottom flasks are used more commonly by professional chemists than Florence flasks.
- Retort: A spherical vessel with a long downward-pointing neck, specially used for distillation or dry distillation of substances.
- Schlenk flask: A round-bottom flask with a built-in plug valve or stopcock.

== Legality ==
In the United States, it is illegal for an individual to possess, manufacture, buy, or sell a three neck round bottom flask while knowing, suspecting or intending the flask's purpose to be the manufacture of illegal or controlled substances. It is not illegal, however to possess, manufacture, buy or sell a three neck round bottom flask for legal activities.

== Gallery ==
Main types of round-bottom flasks

Twin- and triple-neck types
