= Laboratory rubber stopper =

Rubber stopper for flasks and test tubes

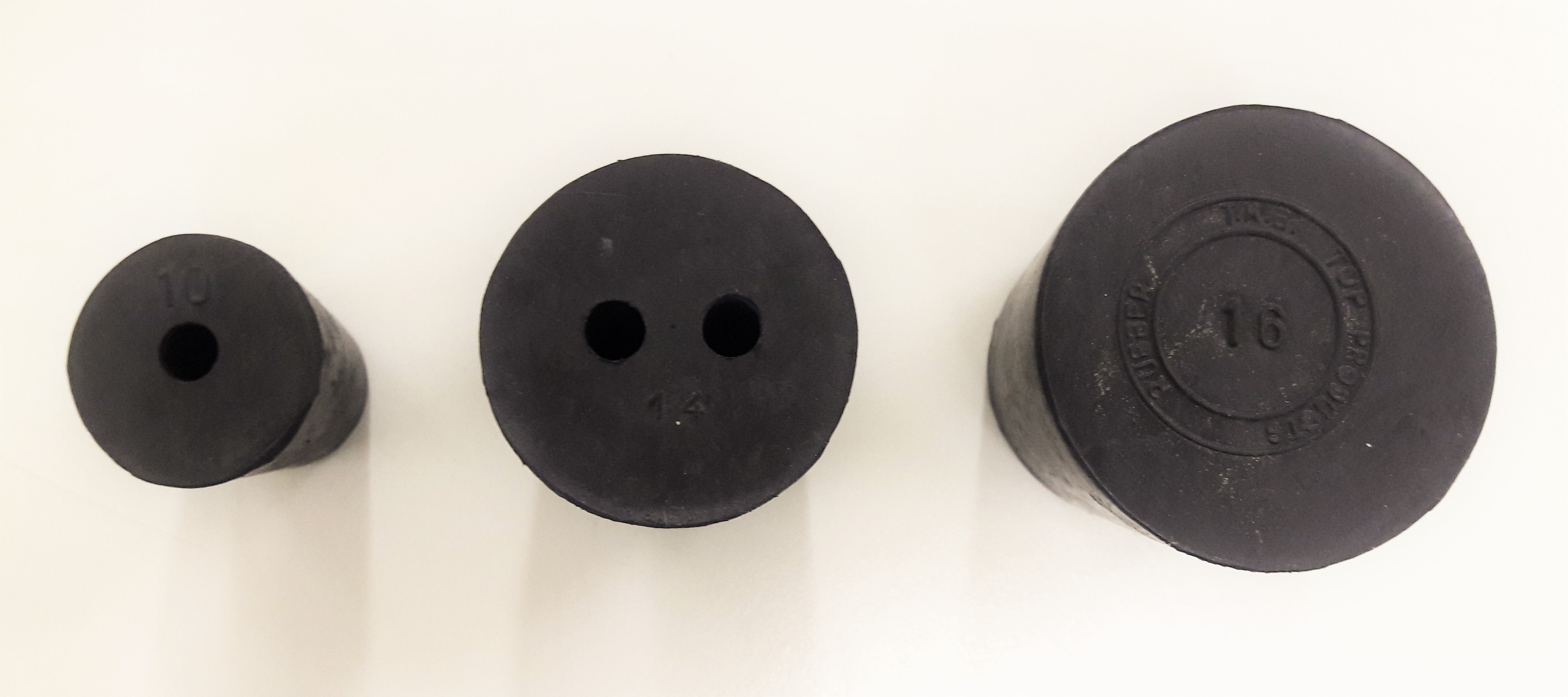
(From left to right) One-hole Rubber bung size 10, Two-hole Rubber bung size 14, and Solid Rubber bung size 16

A laboratory rubber stopper or a rubber bung or a rubber cork is mainly used in chemical laboratories in combination with flasks and test tube and also for fermentation in winery. Generally, in a laboratory, the sizes of rubber stoppers can be varied up to approximately 16 sizes and each of it is specific to certain type of container. As the rubber stopper is used in many experiments, some specific experiment requires a specific material. For example, the M35 Green neoprene stopper is for chemical resistance. For food fermentation, M18 white natural gum is preferred. For high temperature application, red or white silicone rubber stoppers should be used.

== Sizes ==
Rubber bungs can have one or more hole(s) for plugging in tubes depending on the specification of the procedures. To prevent the liquid chemical leaks or escape the container, the rubber bung should fit tightly to the container's opening; the dimension of the rubber bung is of concern. These are some of the sizes that are commonly seen in chemical laboratory.

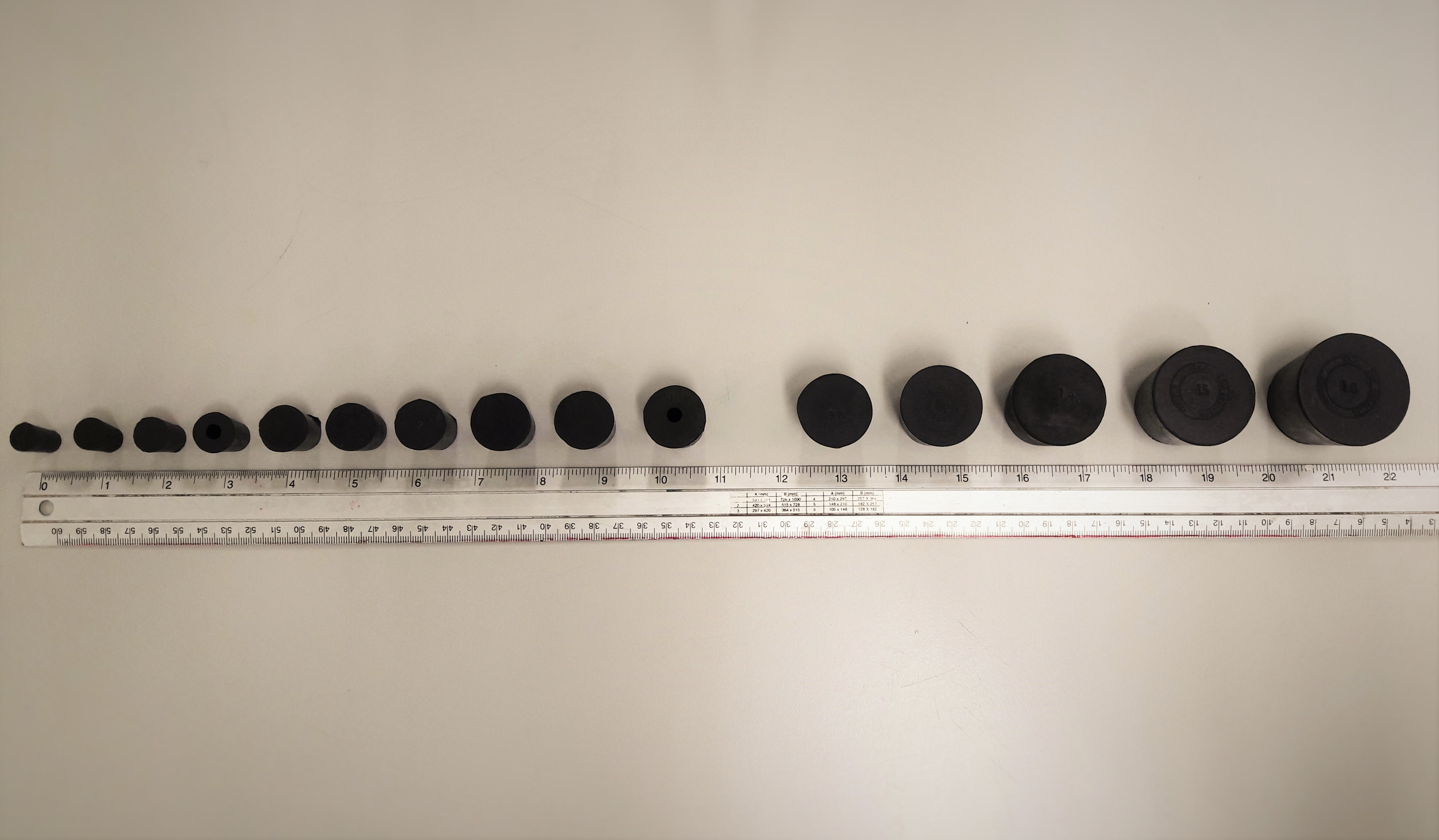
(From left to right) Rubber bungs are aligned from size no. 1, 2, 3, 4, 6, 7, 8, 9, 10, 12, 13, 14, 15, to 16, respectively. (Comparing to the ruler)

Size No.	Top mm	Bottom	
000	12.7	8.2	12x75 test tubes
00	15	10	
0	17	13	
1	19	14	
2	20	16	20x150 or 10ml test tubes
3	24	18	
4	26	20	25x200(150) or 20ml test tubes
5	27	23	50 ml Flasks
6	32	26	250ml Erlenmeyer Flasks
7	37	30	500ml Erlenmeyer Flasks
8	41	33	1000ml Erlenmeyer Flasks/ Florence Flask/ Filter Flask
9	45	37	1000ml Erlenmeyer Flasks/ Florence Flask
10	50	42	1000ml Filter Flasks 2000ml Erlenmeyer Flasks/ Florence Flask
11	56	48	
12	64	54	4000ml Filter Flasks
13	68	58	
14	90	75	
15	103	83	
16	127	90	

== Additional images ==
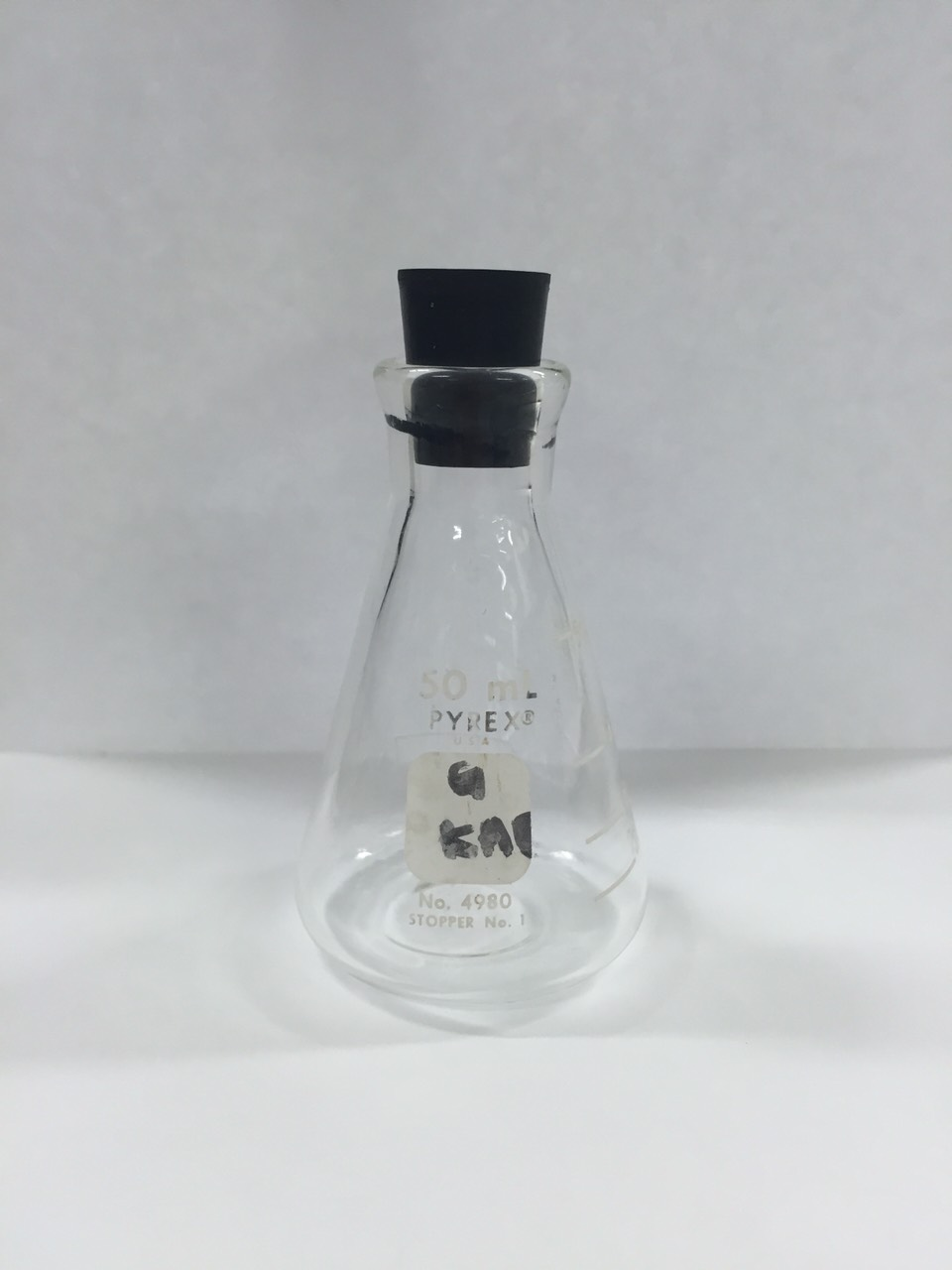
Rubber bung size no.5 fits tightly on 50ml Pyrex® Flask

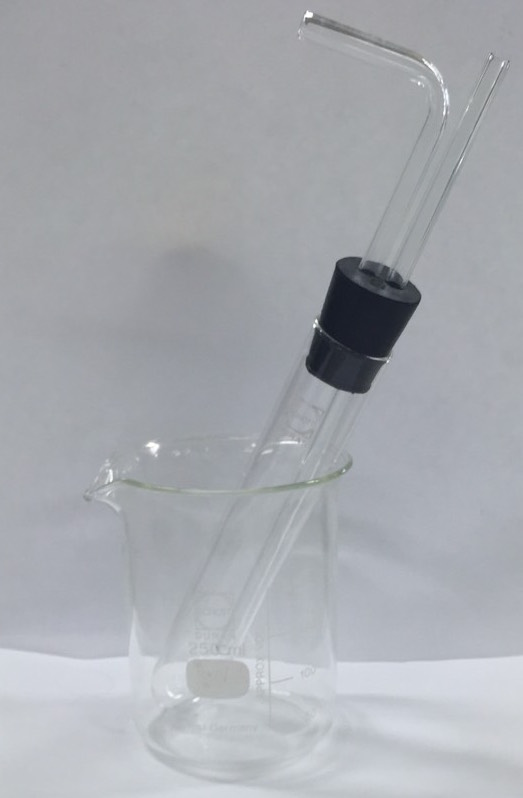
Other equipments such as glass tubes can be plugged into the holes of the rubber stopper

== See also ==
- Bung
- Cork borer
