= Drying tube =

Laboratory equipment for solid dessicant

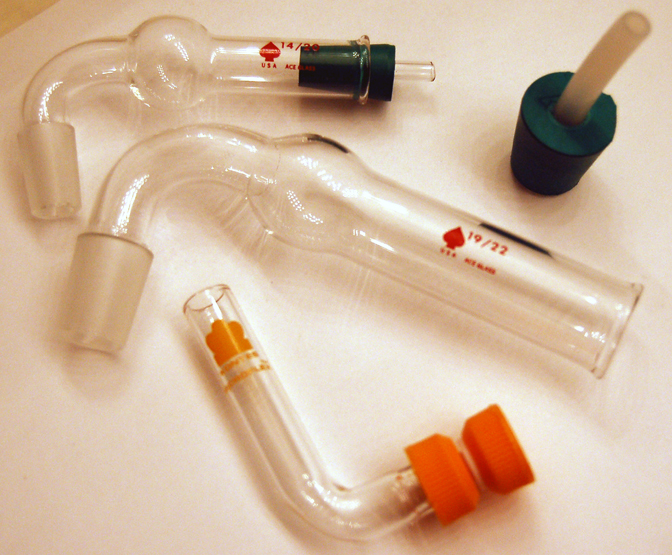
A variety of empty glass drying tubes. When used, they are packed with a desiccant, usually calcium chloride.

A drying tube or guard tube is a tube-like piece of apparatus used to house a disposable solid desiccant, wherein at one end the tube-like structure terminates in a ground glass joint for use in connecting the drying tube to a reaction vessel, for the purpose of keeping the vessel free of moisture.

The tube-like structure is often bent and can also widen to form a bulb/desiccant reservoir. Typically a drying tube is 1–2 cm wide and 5–10 cm long and bent at an angle of about 90 degrees. In use, the drying tube is filled with a rechargeable desiccant such as calcium chloride, and the open end of drying tube is partially blocked (e.g. with wool, glasswool or a bung/cork which has a small bore made in it) and the drying tube is connected to the apparatus to be kept dry via the ground glass joint. If the drying tube is bent the bend is oriented so that solid desiccant does not fall into the reaction vessel. Some drying tubes have a glass sinter to prevent desiccant falling into the reaction vessel. Drying tubes are often prepared in advance and the desiccant can be replaced when exhausted.

Reactions which are being heated, or which evolve gases, must never be sealed because an overpressure may shatter the vessel. Drying tubes are usually fitted on top of the reflux condenser, allowing the pressure to be relieved while excluding atmospheric moisture.

Drying tubes are often used in less-demanding applications, typically in organic syntheses. While the reaction is often carried out at room temperature, the solvent, usually volatile diethyl ether or tetrahydrofuran is already able to displace air directly, making additional measures to exclude atmospheric moisture less important.

An oil bubbler may be a useful substitute. In this case, gases are allowed to escape, but air is not able to enter because the bubbler acts as a one-way valve. Oil bubblers can tolerate an underpressure in the reaction vessel. Oil is sucked into a sump in lieu of air. However, if the pressure in the reaction vessel falls too low, the oil may be sucked into the reaction vessel, contaminating it.

For more demanding applications, a Schlenk line or glovebox may be used to provide an atmosphere of dry, inert gas such as argon or nitrogen.
