= Fernbach flask =

Type of flask for cell culture

Fernbach flask

A Fernbach flask is a type of flask suited for large volume cell culture where the culture requires a large surface area to volume ratio. Typically, they are baffled on the bottom in order to maximize oxygen transfer to the culture medium when shaken. The flask was named after French biologist Auguste Fernbach (1860-1939). A common volume of Fernbach flasks is 2.8 L, although only less than half would typically be used to allow for the best liquid-to-air surface area for appropriate gas exchange. Fernbach flasks are about 8" in diameter, and 9" high.

== See also ==
- Erlenmeyer flask
