= Laboratory flask =

Type of laboratory glassware

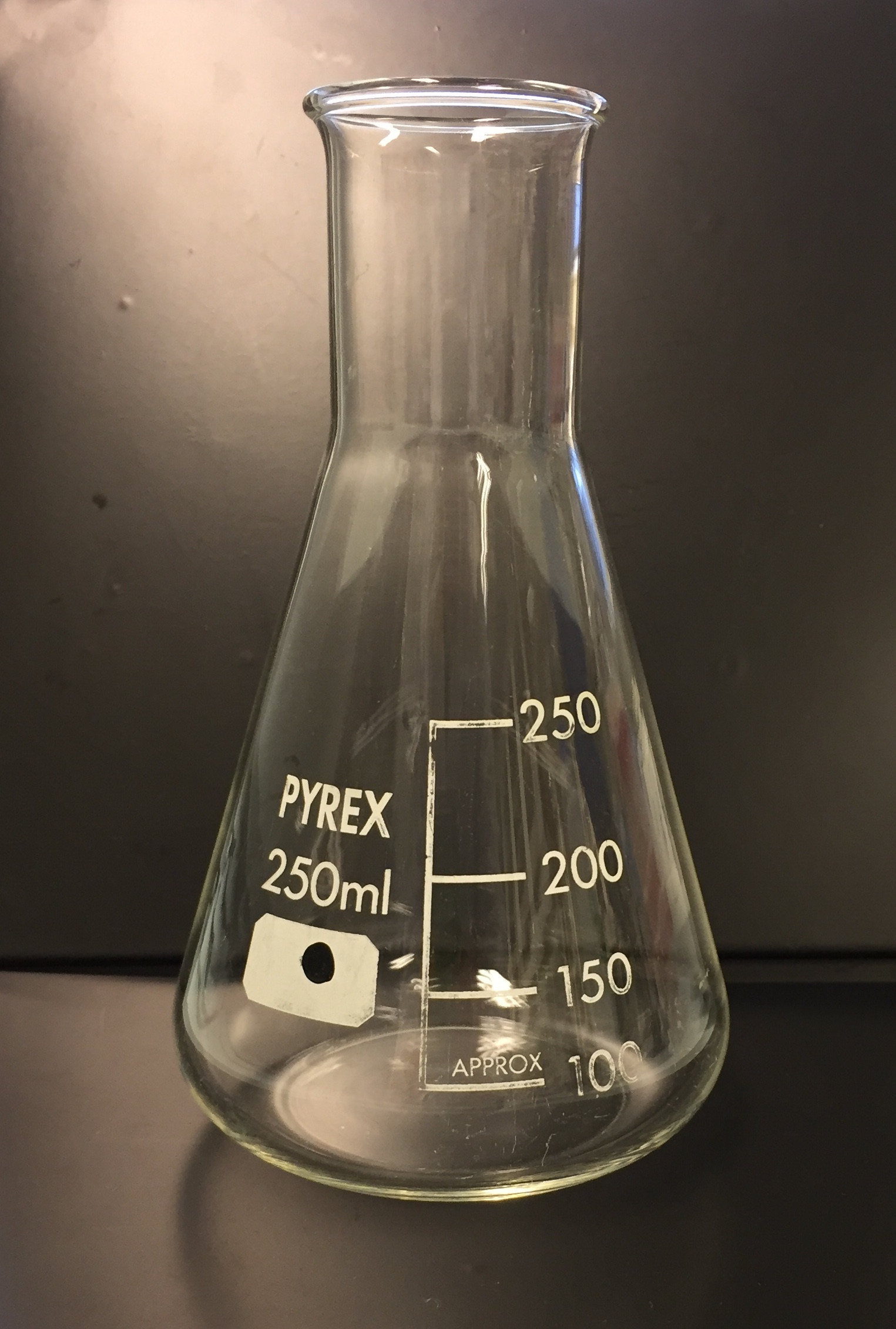
Erlenmeyer flask

Laboratory flasks are vessels or containers that fall into the category of laboratory equipment known as glassware. In laboratory and other scientific settings, they are usually referred to simply as flasks. Flasks come in a number of shapes and a wide range of sizes, but a common distinguishing aspect in their shapes is a wider vessel "body" and one (or sometimes more) narrower tubular sections at the top called necks which have an opening at the top. Laboratory flask sizes are specified by the volume they can hold, typically in SI units such as milliliters (mL or ml) or liters (L or l). Laboratory flasks have traditionally been made of glass, but can also be made of plastic.

At the opening(s) at top of the neck of some glass flasks such as round-bottom flasks, retorts, or sometimes volumetric flasks, there are outer (or female) tapered (conical) ground glass joints. Some flasks, especially volumetric flasks, come with a laboratory rubber stopper, bung, or cap for capping the opening at the top of the neck. Such stoppers can be made of glass or plastic. Glass stoppers typically have a matching tapered inner (or male) ground glass joint surface, but often only of stopper quality. Flasks which do not come with such stoppers or caps included may be capped with a rubber bung or cork stopper.

Flasks can be used for making solutions or for holding, containing, collecting, or sometimes volumetrically measuring chemicals, samples, solutions, etc. for chemical reactions or other processes such as mixing, heating, cooling, dissolving, precipitation, boiling (as in distillation), or analysis.

== List of flasks ==
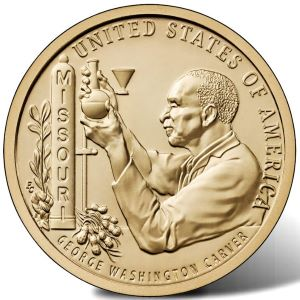
2024 Missouri American Innovation dollar: George Washington Carver examines a Florence flask, here emblematic of biochemistry

There are several types of laboratory flasks, all of which have different functions within the laboratory. Flasks, because of their use, can be divided into:

- Reaction flasks, which are usually spherical (i.e. round-bottom flask) and are accompanied by their necks, at the ends of which are ground glass joints to quickly and tightly connect to the rest of the apparatus (such as a reflux condenser or dropping funnel). The reaction flask is usually made of thick glass and can tolerate large pressure differences, with the result that one can be kept both in a reaction under vacuum, and pressure, sometimes simultaneously. Some varieties are:
  - Multiple neck flasks, which can have two to five, and less commonly, six necks, each topped by ground glass connections which are used in more complex reactions that require the controlled mixing of multiple reagents.
  - Schlenk flask, which is a spherical flask with a ground glass opening and a hose outlet and a vacuum stopcock. The tap makes it easy to connect the flask to a vacuum-nitrogen line through the hose and to facilitate the carrying out of a reaction either in vacuum or in an atmosphere of nitrogen.
- Distillation flasks are intended to contain mixtures that are subject to distillation, as well as to receive the products of distillation. Distillation flasks are available in various shapes. Similar to the reaction flasks, the distillation flasks usually have only one narrow neck and a ground glass joint and are made of thinner glass than the reaction flask, so that they are easier to heat. They are sometimes spherical, test tube shaped or pear-shaped, also known as Kjeldahl Flasks, due to their use with Kjeldahl bulbs.
- Reagent flasks are usually flat-bottomed flasks, which can thus be conveniently placed on the table or in a cabinet. These flasks cannot withstand too much pressure or temperature differences, due to the stresses which arise in a flat bottom; these flasks are usually made of weaker glass than reaction flasks. Certain types of flasks are supplied with a ground glass stopper in them, and others that have threaded necks close with an appropriate nut or automatic dispenser. These flasks are available in two standard shapes:
- Round-bottom flasks are shaped like a tube emerging from the top of a sphere. The flasks are often long necked; sometimes they have the incision on the neck, which precisely defines the volume of flask. They can be used in distillations, or in the heating a product. These types of flask are alternatively called Florence flasks.
- Flasks with flat bottom.
- Cassia flasks, for the analysis of essential oils and aldehyde determination, approx. 100 ml, neck graduated 0–6: 0.1 ml.
- Erlenmeyer flasks (introduced in 1861 by German chemist Emil Erlenmeyer (1825–1909)) are shaped like a cone, usually completed by the ground joint; the conical flasks are very popular because of their low price (they are easy to manufacture) and portability
- Volumetric flask is used for preparing liquids with volumes of high precision. It is a flask with an approximately pear-shaped body and a long neck with a circumferential fill line.
- Dewar flask is a double-walled flask having a near-vacuum between the two walls. These come in a variety of shapes and sizes; some are large and tube-like, others are shaped like regular flasks.
- Evaporating flasks (for rotary evaporator) centered, pear shaped, with socket or with flange.
- Powder flasks, for drying of powdered substances, pear shaped, with socket
- Retorts are simplified distillation apparatuses, with long, down turned necks, and round bases. They have largely been replaced by condensers.
- Büchner flask or Sidearm flask or Suction flask—they are a flat-bottomed flask, but made of very thick and resistant glass. They are usually a cone shape—similar to the shape of an Erlenmeyer flask, but also have side neck, usually affixed to the side, 2 / 3 up from the bottom. The flasks are used to cooperate with vacuum aspirator or vacuum pumps in the vacuum filtration, or as additional security during the distillation and other processes carried out under reduced pressure.
- Culture flasks for growing cells are designed to improve aeration by including baffles that aid in mixing when placed on a shaker table.
- Beaker (glassware)

Many of these flasks can be wrapped in a protective outer layer of glass, leaving a gap between the inner and outer walls. These are called jacketed flasks; they are often used in a reaction using a cooling fluid.

Erlenmeyer flask or conical flask.

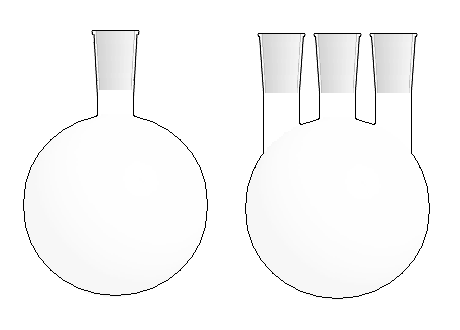
Round-bottom flask—a flask with a spherical body and one or more necks with ground glass joints.

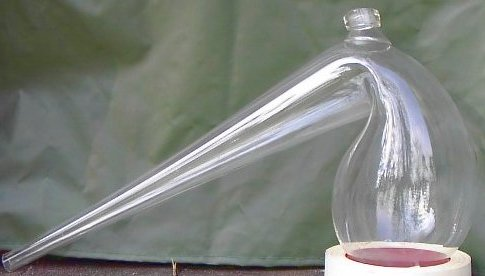
Retort—a spherical vessel with a long downward-pointing neck.

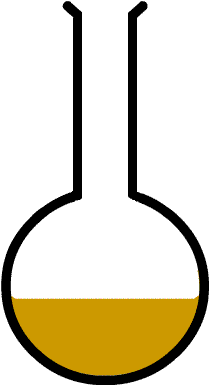
Florence flask—a flask with a round body and one longer neck without a ground glass joint.

Büchner flask or sidearm flask—a thick-walled conical flask with a short hose-connection tube on the side of the neck.

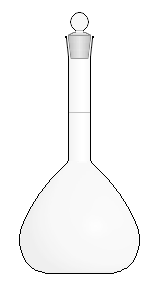
Volumetric flask—for preparing liquids with volumes of high precision. It is a flask with an approximately pear-shaped body and a long neck with a circumferential fill line.

Dewar flask—a double-walled flask having a near-vacuum between the two walls.

== Legal issues ==
Like many other common pieces of glassware, Erlenmeyer flasks could potentially be used in the production of drugs. In an effort to reduce their proliferation by theft from education institutions where they are commonly stored, some U.S. states (including Texas) have requirements to audit and report unusual inventory discrepancies (and not due to normal wear or breakage). Reporting requirements also cover chemicals identified as common starting materials.
