= Florence flask =

Glass laboratory container

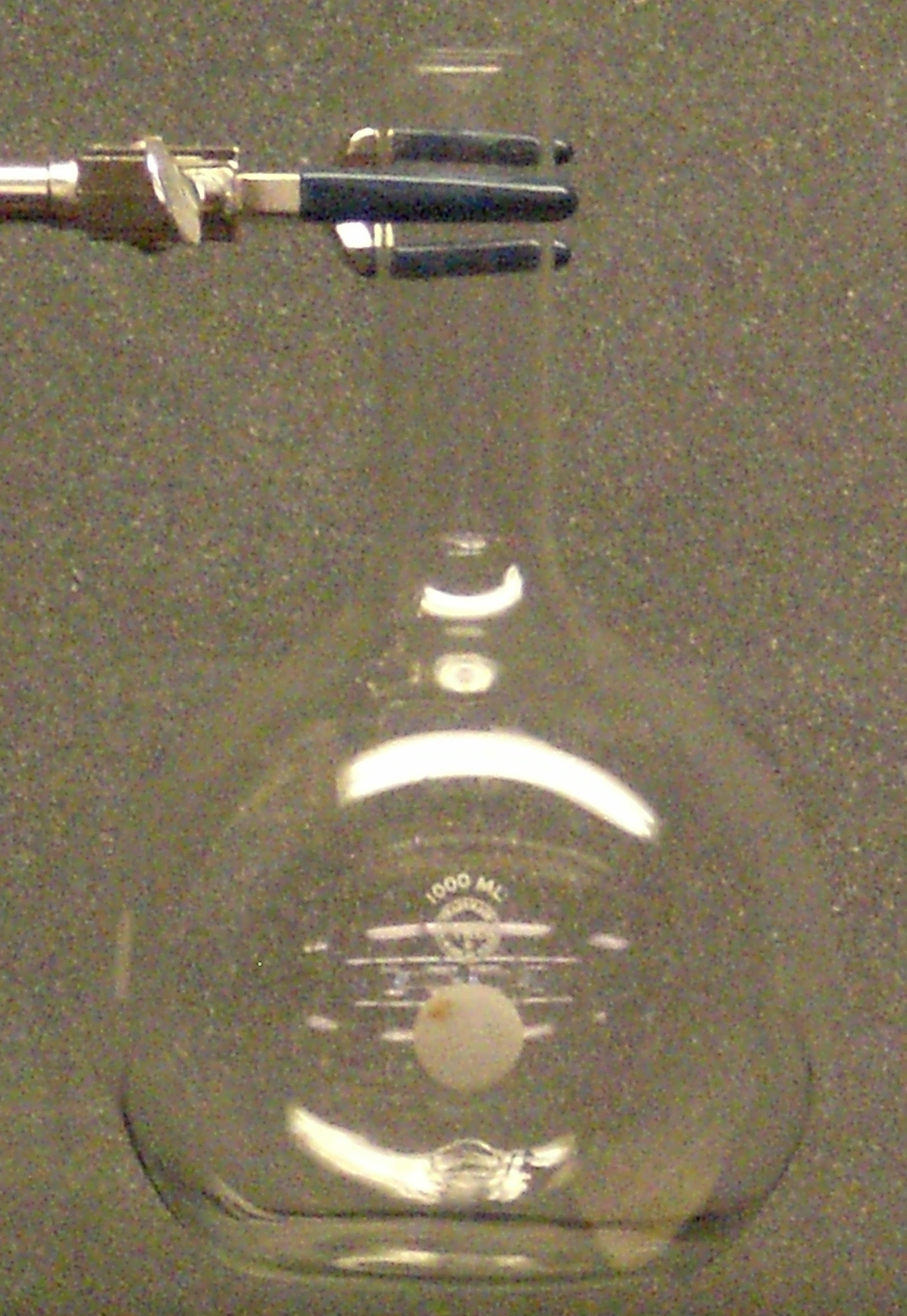
- Photograph of a 1 liter Florence flask suspended by its neck with a three-finger clamp
- Uses: Boiling; Distillation
- Related items: Round-bottom flask

A Florence flask/boiling flask is a type of flask used as an item of laboratory glassware and is named after the city Florence. It is used as a container to hold liquids. A Florence flask has a round body, a long neck, and often a flat bottom. It is designed for uniform heating, boiling, distillation and ease of swirling; it is produced in a number of different glass thicknesses to stand different types of use. They are often made of borosilicate glass for heat and chemical resistance. Traditional Florence flasks typically do not have a ground glass joint on their rather longer necks, but typically have a slight lip or flange around the tip of the neck. The common volume for a Florence flask is 1 litre.

== See also ==
- Erlenmeyer flask
- Round-bottom flask
