= Fleaker =

Container for liquids in a laboratory

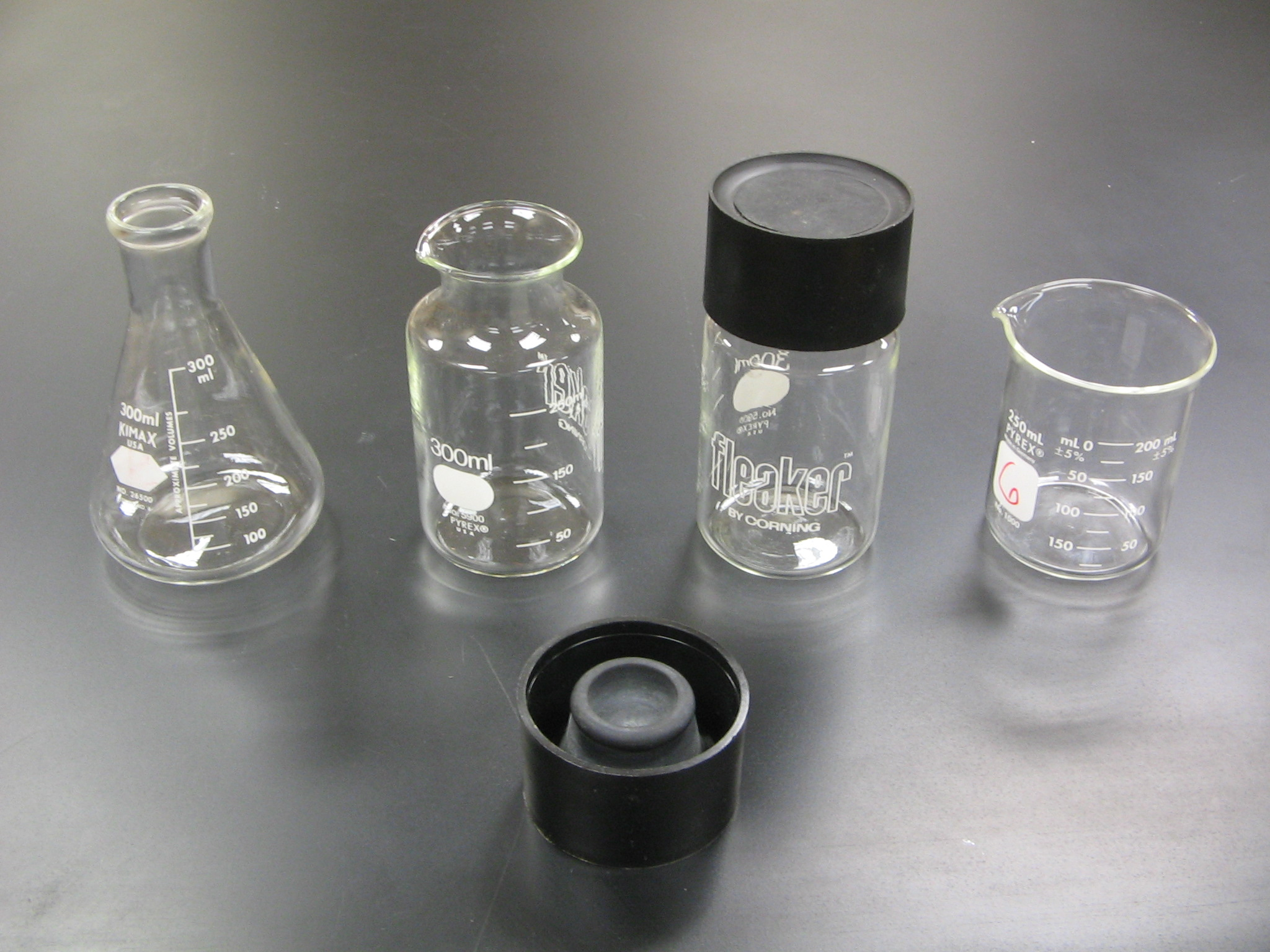
- A 300 mL Erlenmeyer flask (left); two fleakers (center-left, with lid upside-down in front; center-right, with lid on; both also 300 mL each); and a 250 mL beaker (right)
- Uses: Mixing; Chemical reaction containment
- Inventor: Roy Eddleman
- Related items: Erlenmeyer flask Beaker

A Fleaker is a brand of container for liquids used in the laboratory. It can be described as a hybrid design, combining features of the Griffin beaker and the Erlenmeyer flask.

Like a beaker, the bottom is flat, with the sides meeting the bottom at a 90-degree angle. The sides are vertical for most of the height; near the top, the sides curve in to form a neck with a widely flared rim. The wide rim makes it easier to pour from or filter into; the narrow neck reduces loss of the contents due to splashing and serves as a grip for handling and pouring. Fleaker containers have a plastic lid with a built-in rubber stopper. When on the Fleaker, the lid covers the narrow neck. Fleaker containers work as well as other glassware for liquids and solutions, but are inappropriate for slurries, precipitates, and recrystallizations (since the narrow neck makes it difficult to remove solids completely from a Fleaker).

The Fleaker was invented by Roy Eddleman, founder of Spectrum Medical Industries (now Spectrum Laboratories). Fleaker is a registered trademark of Spectrum Laboratories, licensed to Corning.
