= Syringe filter =

A 0.2 micrometre luer lock syringe filter that is not a "wheel filter" type shape.

A syringe filter (sometimes called a wheel filter if it has a wheel-like shape) is a single-use filter cartridge. It is attached to the end of a syringe for use. Syringe filters may have Luer lock fittings, though not universally so. The use of a needle is optional; where desired it may be fitted to the end of the syringe filter.

A syringe filter generally consists of a plastic housing with a membrane that serves as a filter. The fluid to be purified may be cleaned only by being pushed through the filter from syringe, it cannot be drawn into the syringe through the filter due to its one way process.

== Forms ==
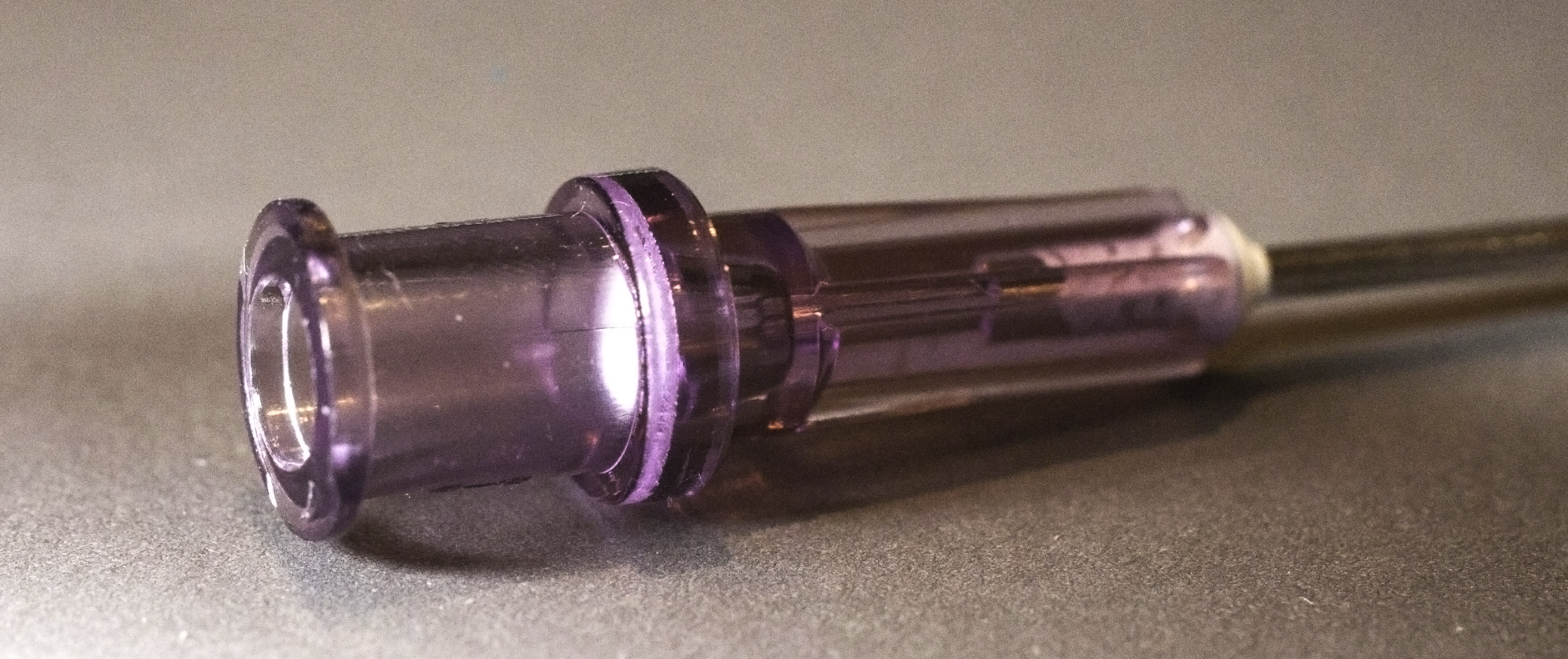
Close up view of a 5 μm filter needle. The filter is visible as the white, round disk on the left hand side.

In scientific applications, the most common sizes available are 0.2 or 0.22 μm and 0.45 μm pores. These sizes are sufficient for HPLC use. The smallest known sterile syringe microfilter have pore sizes of 0.02 μm. Membrane diameters of 10 mm, 13 mm, 25 mm are common as well. Some syringe filters for small volumes may not resemble a wheel at all.

The syringe filter body may be made of such materials as polypropylene and nylon. The filter membrane may be of PTFE, nylon, or other treated products for specific purposes. Most manufacturers publish compatibility wallcharts advising users of compatibility between their products and organic solvents or corrosive liquids (e.g. trifluoroacetic acid).

== Application ==
Syringe filters may be used to remove particles from a sample, prior to analysis by HPLC or other techniques involving expensive instruments. Particles easily damage an HPLC due to the narrow bore and high pressures within. Syringe filters are quite suitable for Schlenk line work, which makes extensive use of needles and syringes (see cannula transfer). Being relatively affordable, they may be used for general purpose filtration, especially of smaller volumes where losses by soaking up filter paper are significant.

Syringe filters are also available for the filtration of gases, and for the removal of bacteria from a sample.

Disk filters are frequently used for the onsite manufacture of parenteral drugs and sterile eye drops, in order to remove microbiological contaminations (sterile filtration).

== Harm reduction in recreational drug use ==
Filters with 0.1 μm compared with 0.2 μm pore size have enhanced bacterial removal according to one study.

== See also ==
- Microfiltration
- Adulteration
- Drug injection
