= Cannula transfer =

Chemical laboratory technique

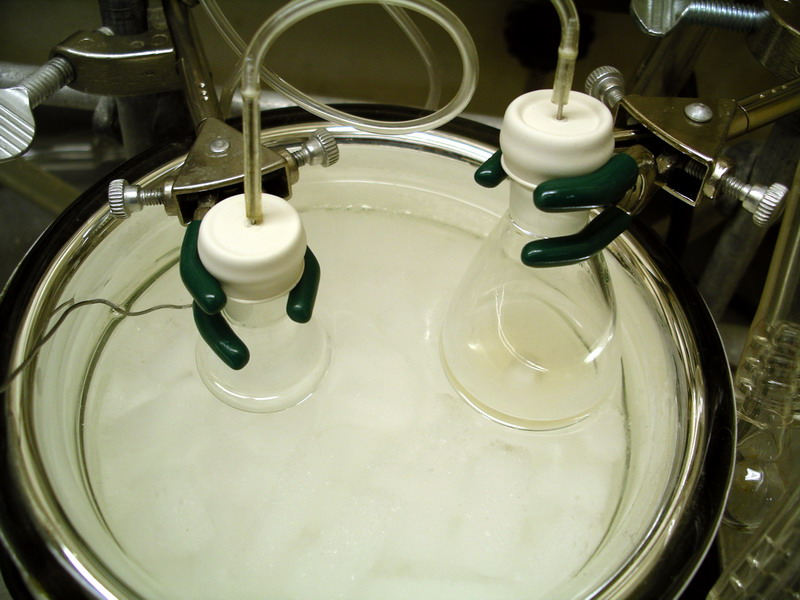
Septa seal the two conical flasks. A cannula is used to transfer THF from the flask on the right to the flask on the left.

Cannula transfer or cannulation is a set of air-free techniques used with a Schlenk line, in transferring liquid or solution samples between reaction vessels via cannulae, avoiding atmospheric contamination. Syringes are not the same as cannulae, but cannula transfer techniques remain relevant when using them for this purpose.

Two methods of cannula transfer are popular: vacuum, and pressure. Both utilize differences in pressures between two vessels to push the fluid through. Often, the main difficulty encountered is slow transfer due to the high viscosity of the fluid.

== Equipment ==
=== Septa ===
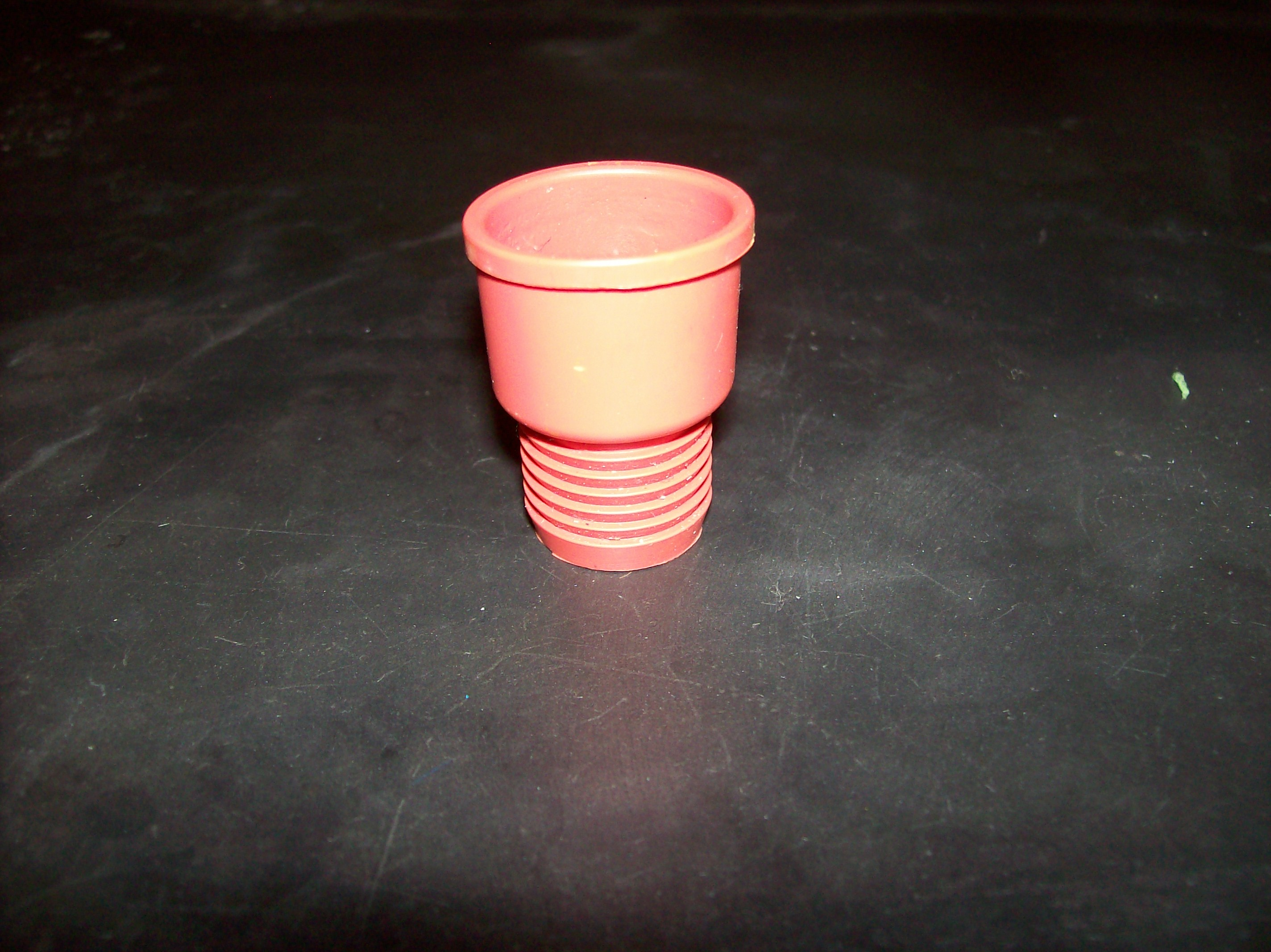
A rubber septum. The top folds over the neck of a flask to give an airtight seal

Septa (sg.: septum) are rubber stoppers which seal flasks or bottles. They give an airtight seal, preventing the ingress of the atmosphere, but are able to be pierced by sharp needles or cannulae.

=== Cannula ===
Cannulae are hollow flexible tubes. Their bore is usually 16-22 gauge thick. They are commonly made of stainless steel or PTFE for their chemical resistance. Stainless steel cannulae are usually 2–3 feet long, due to their relative inflexibility, while PTFE cannulae can be much shorter. The ends are usually sharp and non-coring, allowing them to easily pierce a rubber septum, without being clogged by rubber particles. Flat tips tend to provide more complete transfer of fluids.

Stainless steel cannulae tend to collapse when cut with wire cutters. They are best cut using pipecutters of appropriate size. Other workers recommend deeply scoring the cannula with a triangular file, then sharply snapping the weakened section.

=== Needles and syringes ===
Wide-bore needles of similar gauge are often used. Unlike hypodermic-type needles sometimes used in the chemistry laboratory, these needles tend to be reused due to cost. Long needles may be flexible enough to be bent in U-shapes; shorter needles often are not.

Polypropylene syringes used for medical applications are least expensive. While the material is relatively solvent-resistant, although they are designed primarily for aqueous solutions, some degradation or leaching by the contents may occur. In particular, the black rubber seal may swell and cause the plunger to seize.

All-glass gas-tight syringes have better solvent resistance, although they tend to leak more than plastic syringes. Greases used on the barrel may leach into the contents. Glass syringes with a teflon seal at the plunger are available as well, but they are more expensive. They tend to be used for microsyringes (usually containing less than 100 μL). Luer fittings are preferred, as needles are locked in even under higher pressure, e.g. when transferring viscous liquids.

=== Cleaning and storage ===
Cannulae and needles should be quickly flushed out with an appropriate solvent to prevent undetectable corrosion damage to the stainless steel. Since they are usually used for air-sensitive work, they are commonly kept in a hot oven, to reduce the adsorption of water molecules. Before use, they are usually subjected to three vacuum-refill cycles to remove any traces of air.

== Cannula transfer methods ==
This technique has been described with illustrated detail.

=== Vacuum based ===
The two ends of the cannula are inserted through the septa covering donating and receiving flasks. The cannula extends below the surface of the fluid to be transferred. A vacuum is applied to the receiving flask, and the low pressure relative to the donating flask causes the fluid to flow through the cannula.

Vacuum transfers risk drawing air into the system, spoiling the air-free environment. Loss of the fluid by evaporation is another problem, although less so where the fluid is a neat liquid, than a solution of known concentration.

=== Positive pressure ===
The receiving flask is connected to its own gas bubbler, while the donating flask is connected to a source of inert gas. By increasing the inert gas pressure, the pressure within the donating flask is raised higher than the receiving flask, and the fluid is forced through the cannula.

Pressure transfers can be slow. Inert gas lines are usually vented out of a gas bubbler placed in-line to prevent overpressure. The vents need to be isolated by capping the bubbler outlet, or stopping the egress of inert gas with a stopcock or pinch clamp, to ensure sufficient pressure to complete the transfer. The use of a mercury bubbler instead of one filled with oil used to be popular, but is out of favor due to the difficulty in dealing with mercury spills.

=== Syphoning ===
By carefully filling the cannula fully with either above techniques, then allowing the pressures within the vessels to equalize, a syphon may be set up. This arrangement allows the slow addition of a fluid to a reaction vessel; the rate of addition may be controlled by adjusting the relative height of the donor vessel.

== Handling pyrophoric material ==
While handling pyrophoric material (e.g. tert-butyllithium and trimethylaluminum), traces of the compound at the tip of the needle or cannula may ignite, and cause a clog. Some workers prefer to contain the tip of the needle or cannula in a short glass tube flushed with an inert gas, and sealed via two septa.

Instead of exposing the needle tip to the air, it is withdrawn into the inerted tube. Where desired, it may be inserted into a flask via two septa (one on the tube, one on the flask). Used this way, needle tip fires are eliminated, reducing the obvious hazards. Also, there is a reduced tendency for the needle tip to clog due to the reaction of traces of the reagent with air to give salts.

== Filtration ==
Filtration is most easily accomplished using a syringe filter. PTFE filters tend to be most chemically resistant; nylon filters are less so.

Using a cannula, a filter stick Air-free technique#Gallery may be used. A filter stick is a short length of glass tubing sealed on one end with a septum, and sealed on the other with filter paper, or a sintered glass frit.

For larger volumes, it may be preferable to connect the donor and receiving flasks via ground glass joints to a sintered glass filter tube.

== Gallery ==
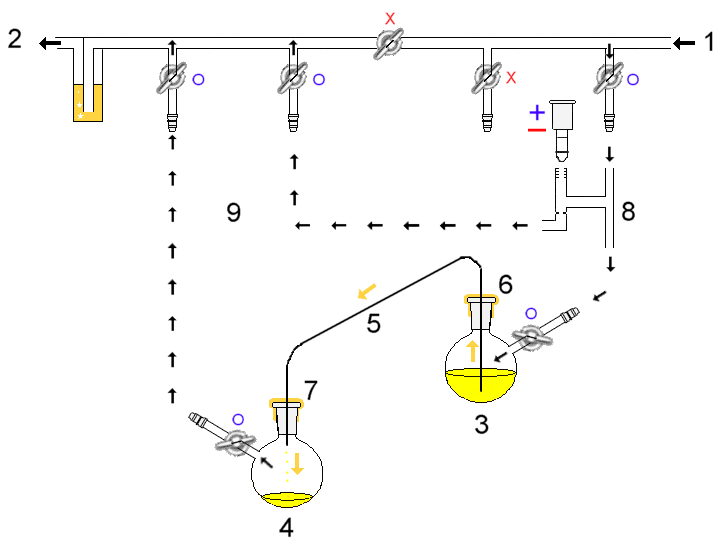
Cannula: intra-bleed valve

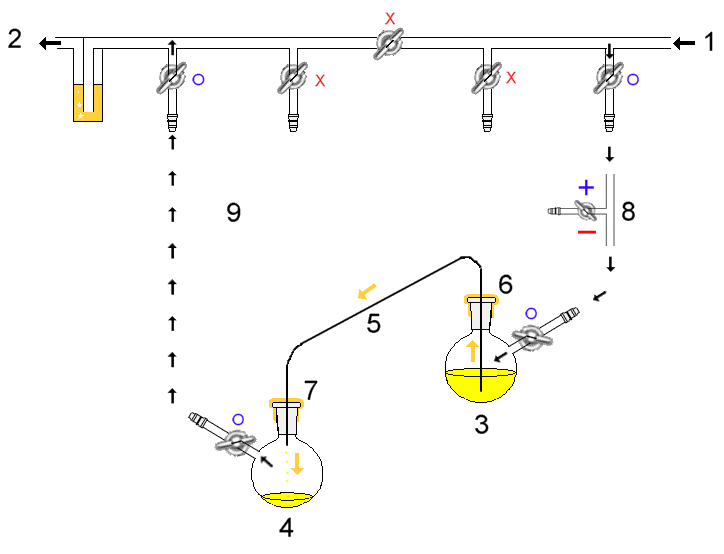
Cannula: extra-bleed valve

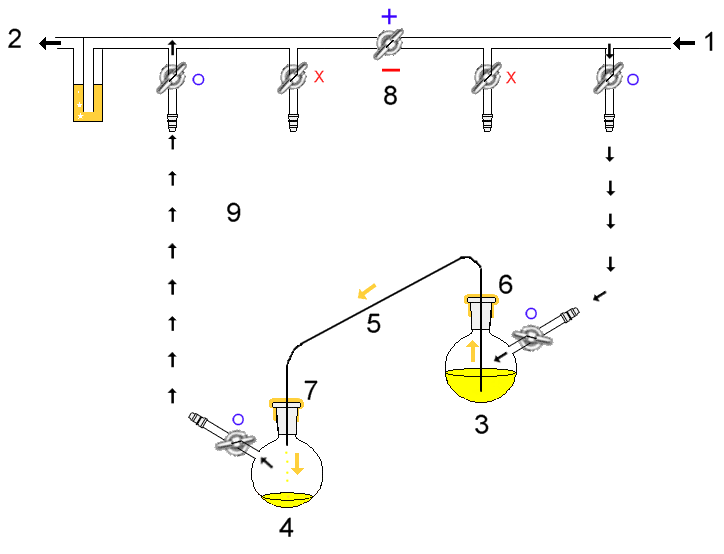
Cannula: (Simple) no bleed valve

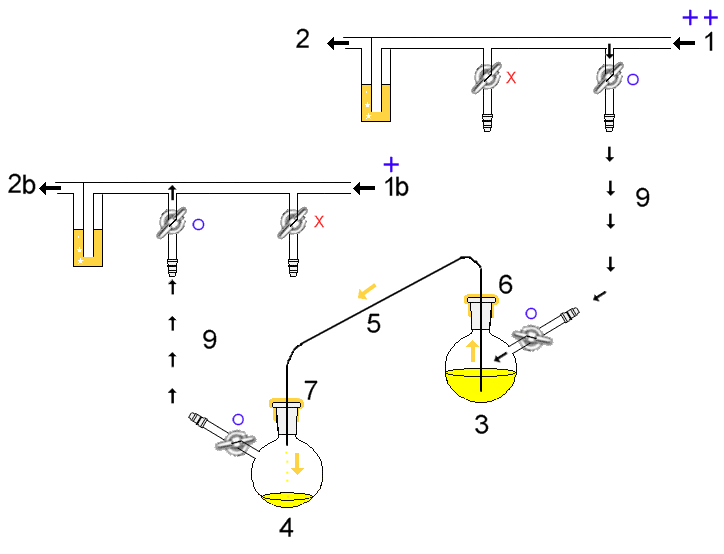
Cannula: two manifold system

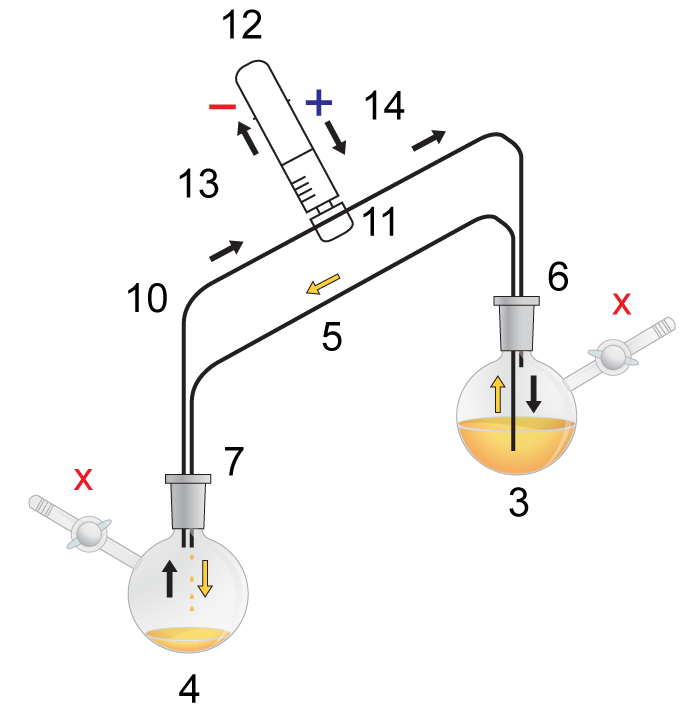
Cannula: syringe valve

Air-sensitive cannulas:

1: Pressure in (gas in) 2: Pressure out (oil bubbler orange) 3: Higher flask with transfer liquid (yellow) to transfer 4: Lower receiving flask/transferred liquid (yellow)

5: Liquid transfer cannula 6: Septum (orange) on transfer flask 7: Septum (orange) on receiving flask 8: Pressure-control regulator/stopcock

9: Tubing/ gas-line (not shown for clarity, arrows show connectivity) 10: Gas cannula 11: 2-way syringe stopcock 12: Gas-tight syringe

13: Gas/pressure removed from flask 4 14: Gas/pressure added to flask 3

O = Open stopcock; X = Closed stopcock; black-arrow = Gas flow direction, orange arrow = Liquid flow direction
