= Gas bubbler =

Laboratory equipment used to remove air

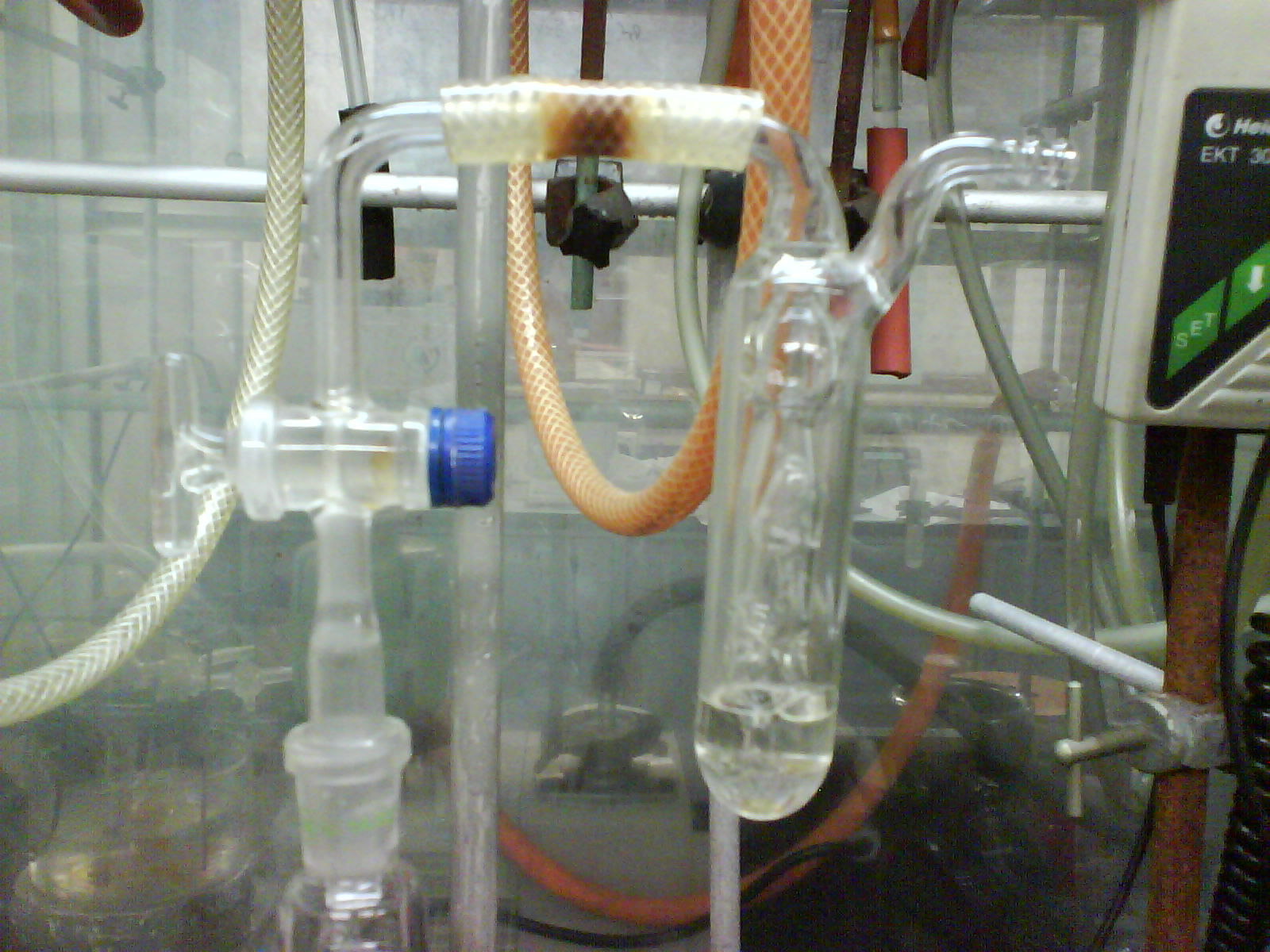
A simple gas bubbler containing silicone oil

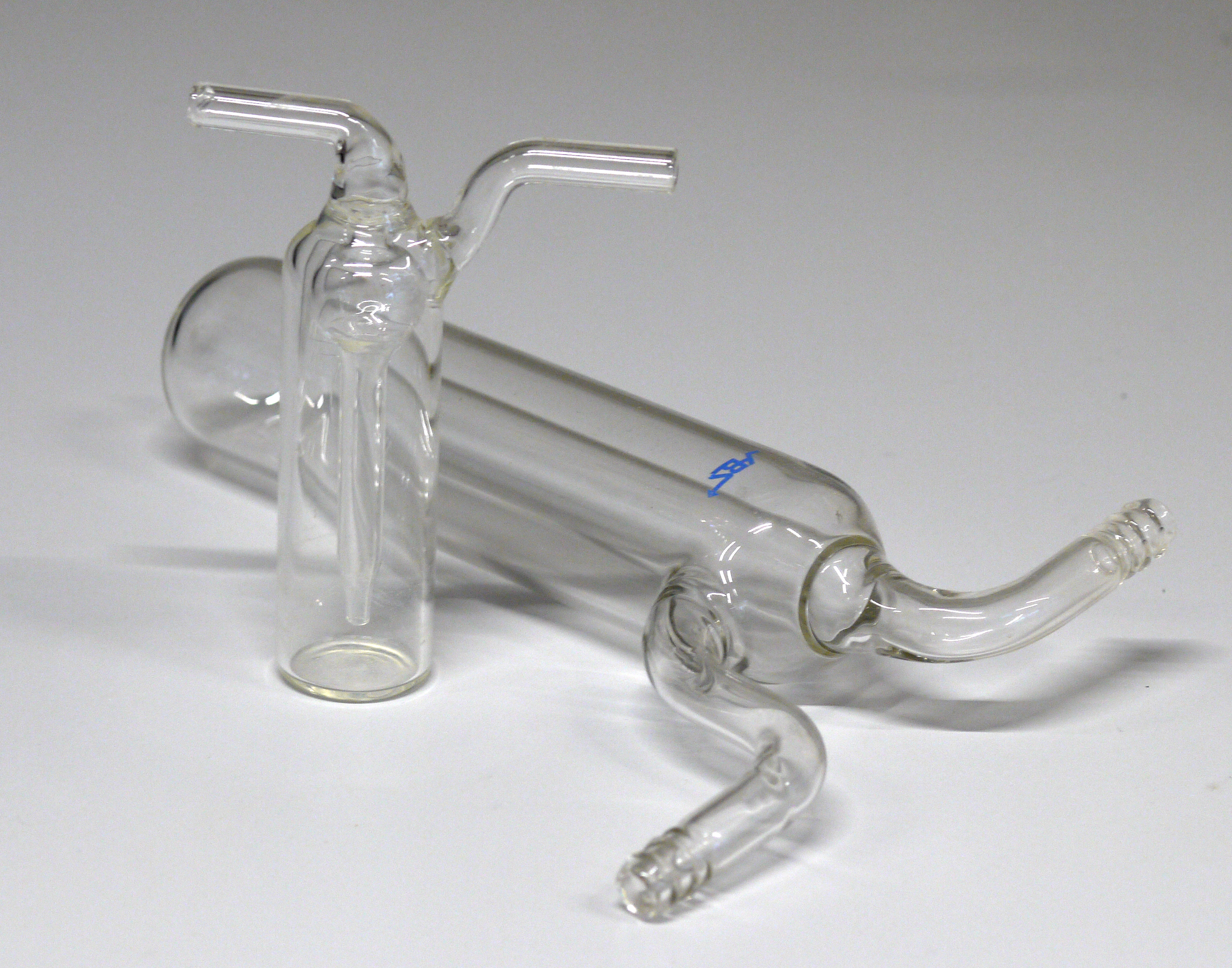
Gas bubblers in two sizes

A gas bubbler is a piece of laboratory glassware which consists of a glass bulb filled with a small amount of fluid—usually mineral or silicone oil, less commonly mercury. The inlet to the bulb is connected to a ground glass joint, while the outlet is vented to the air.

Gas bubblers are used to exclude air from a reaction or a system. In the former case, the gas bubbler is fitted on the condenser of the reaction set-up. In the latter case, an oil bubbler is usually installed at the end of the inert gas manifold on a Schlenk line to prevent contamination by atmospheric oxygen and water.

A gas bubbler acts as a one-way valve—gases (hot air, evolved gases, solvent vapors) from the inlet will bubble through the fluid before being vented to the atmosphere. If there were an underpressure in the reaction vessel (such as when heat is removed, and the gases within contract), some fluid is sucked into a sump to equalize the pressure, instead of air. Wherever possible, such "suck back" should be avoided by filling the reaction apparatus with inert gas because an excessively low pressure will cause oil to be sucked into the reaction vessel, contaminating it.

The bubbles allow the worker to visibly confirm that the system is being flushed with inert gas; the rate at which bubbles form allow the worker to adjust the inlet pressure.

== Oil bubblers ==
Oil bubblers are filled with mineral or silicone oil. These are both quite resistant to chemical attack. Oil bubblers are predominantly used; the oil is inexpensive and not toxic.

A drawback is that due to oil's lower density, in event of underpressure in the reaction vessel, enough oil may be sucked through the sump into the inert gas system to contaminate it. Due to the same reason, the pressure within the inert gas system will always remain close to atmospheric. This is a disadvantage when attempting cannula transfers using inert gas pressure to force a liquid reagent into another using a cannula.

== Mercury bubbler ==
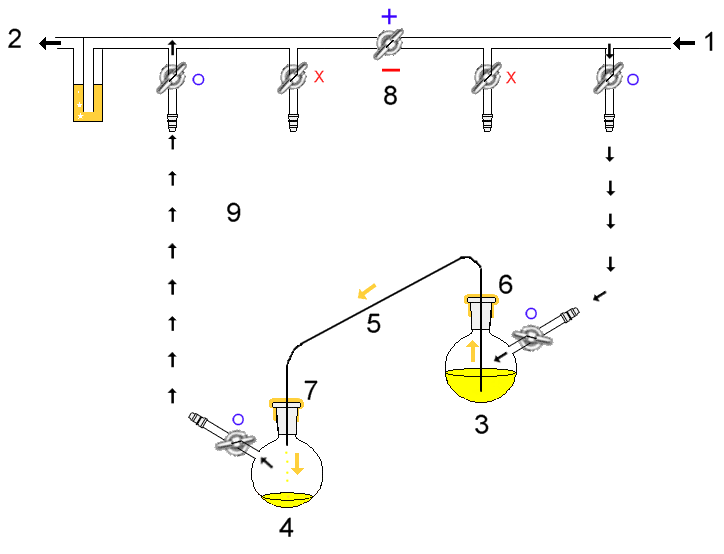
Cannula transfer using gas pressure

Mercury bubblers are largely similar in construction to oil bubblers. They usually have a longer body to prevent mercury from splashing out through the bubbler outlet, and the inlet connection usually has a sintered glass disc to prevent mercury from being sucked back into the inert gas system when refilling an evacuated vessel.

The most important advantage of mercury over oil, is that a fair amount of pressure can be maintained within the inert gas system (equivalent to the height of the mercury column). Tall columns may be used to exploit this further. By increasing the pressure within the inert gas system, boiling points are increased, allowing reactions under reflux to be carried out at a higher temperature. Also, cannula transfers are accomplished more easily due to the greater gas pressure available to push a liquid reagent from a vessel, through a cannula, into another vessel.

Mercury bubblers are avoided where possible, due to the difficulty and expense in dealing with mercury spills. In addition, mercury can react with various chemicals, such as ammonia and acetylenes, with potentially hazardous results. In the context of cannula transfer, mercury bubblers may be avoided by pulling (instead of pushing) liquids through the cannula by vacuum. Alternatively, the oil bubbler may be closed off from the inert gas line with a stopcock, allowing inert gas to push the reagent through the cannula. Excess pressure is bled off from a bubbler fitted directly over the receiving vessel.

== See also ==
- A drying tube is used to exclude moisture from reactions for less demanding applications
- Fermentation lock
