= Erlenmeyer flask =

Laboratory flask with a flat bottom

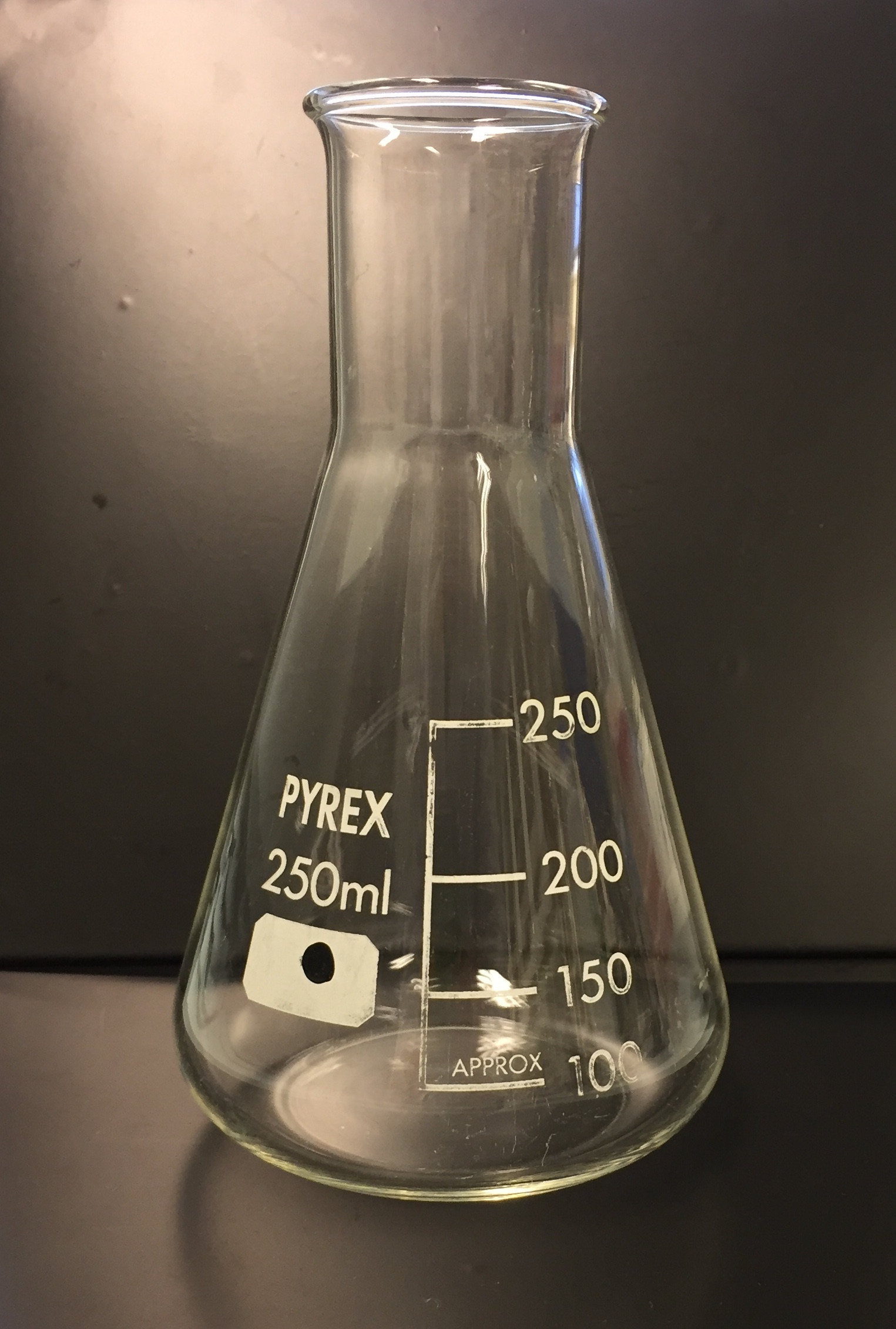
Erlenmeyer flask

An Erlenmeyer flask, also known as a conical flask (British English) or a titration flask, is a type of laboratory flask with a flat bottom, a conical body, and a cylindrical neck. It is named after the German chemist Emil Erlenmeyer (1825–1909), who invented it in 1860.

Erlenmeyer flasks have wide bases and narrow necks. They may be graduated, and often have spots of ground glass or enamel where they can be labeled with a pencil. It differs from the beaker in its tapered body and narrow neck. Depending on the application, they may be constructed from glass or plastic, in a wide range of volumes.

The mouth of the Erlenmeyer flask may have a beaded lip that can be stoppered or covered. Alternatively, the neck may be fitted with ground glass or other connector for use with more specialized stoppers or attachment to other apparatus. A Büchner flask is a common design modification for filtration under vacuum.

== Uses ==
=== In chemistry ===
Method of swirling an Erlenmeyer flask during titration

The slanted sides and narrow neck of this flask allow the contents of the flask to be mixed by swirling, without risk of spillage, making them suitable for titrations by placing it under the buret and adding solvent and the indicator in the Erlenmeyer flask. Such features similarly make the flask suitable for boiling liquids. Hot vapour condenses on the upper section of the Erlenmeyer flask, reducing solvent loss. Erlenmeyer flasks' narrow necks can also support filter funnels.

The final two attributes of Erlenmeyer flasks make them especially appropriate for recrystallization. The sample to be purified is heated to a boil, and sufficient solvent is added for complete dissolution. The receiving flask is filled with a small amount of solvent, and heated to a boil. The hot solution is filtered through a fluted filter paper into the receiving flask. Hot vapors from the boiling solvent keep the filter funnel warm, avoiding the premature crystallization.

Like beakers, Erlenmeyer flasks are not normally suitable for accurate volumetric measurements. Their stamped volumes are approximate within about 5% accuracy.

=== In biology ===
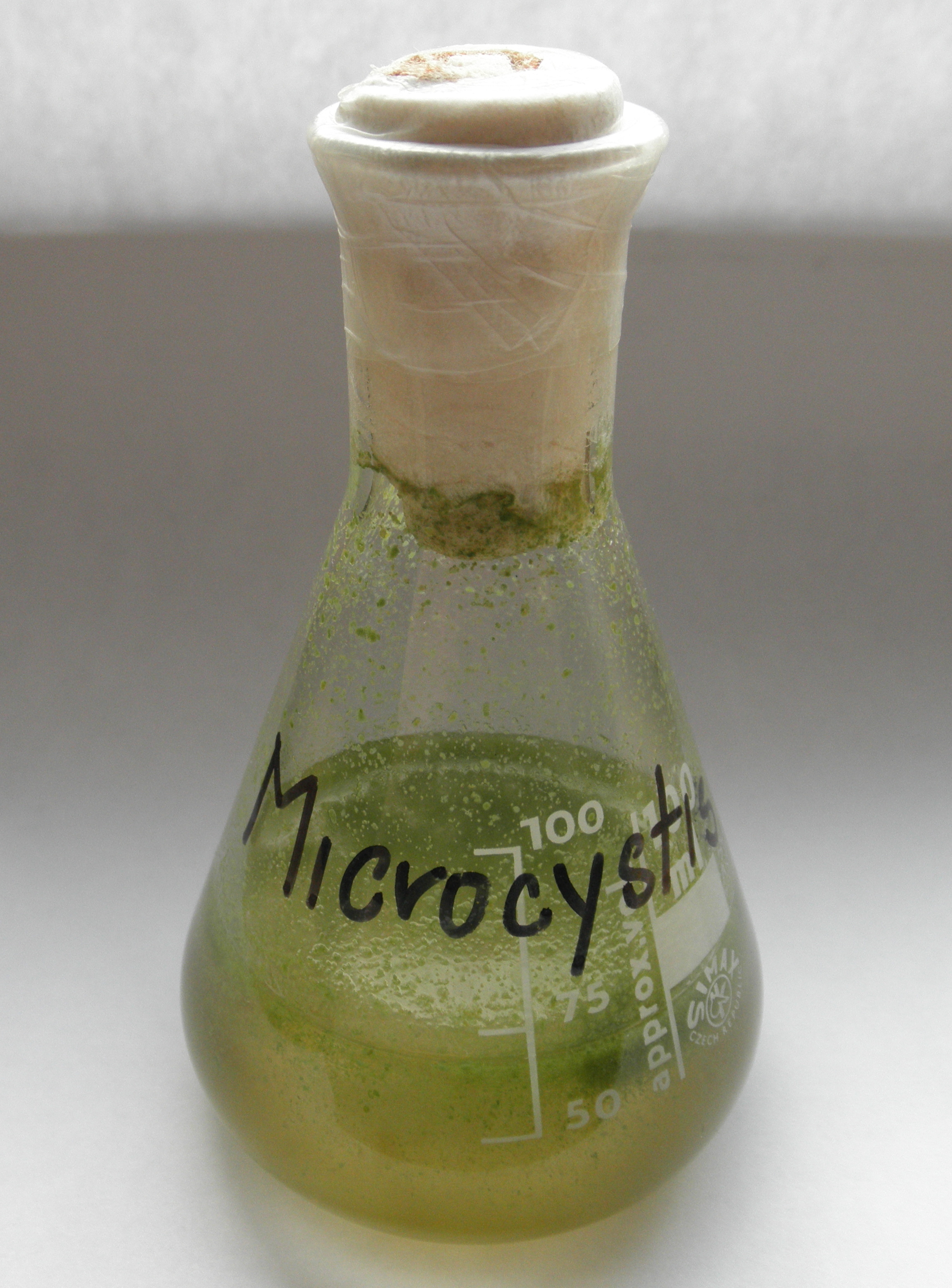
Microcystis floating colonies in an Erlenmeyer flask.

Erlenmeyer flasks are also used in microbiology for the preparation of microbial cultures. Erlenmeyer flasks used in cell culture are sterilized and may feature vented closures to enhance gas exchange during incubation and shaking. The use of minimal liquid volumes, typically no more than one fifth of the total flask volume, and baffles molded into the flask's internal surface both serve to maximize gas transfer and promote chaotic mixing when the flasks are orbitally shaken. The oxygen transfer rate in Erlenmeyer flasks depends on the agitation speed, the liquid volume, and the shake-flask design. The shaking frequency has the most significant impact on oxygen transfer.

Oxygenation and mixing of liquid cultures further depend on rotation of the liquid "in-phase", meaning the synchronous movement of the liquid with the shaker table. Under certain conditions the shaking process leads to a breakdown of liquid motion – called "out-of-phase phenomenon". This phenomenon has been intensively characterized for shake flask bioreactors. Out-of-phase conditions are associated with a strong decrease in mixing performance, oxygen transfer, and power input. Main factor for out-of-phase operation is the viscosity of the culture medium, but also the vessel diameter, low filling levels and/or a high number of baffles.

== Legal restriction ==
To impede illicit drug manufacturers, the state of Texas previously restricted the sale of Erlenmeyer flasks to those who have the requisite permits. On September 1, 2019, SB 616 amended the law so that permits are no longer required, but accurate inventory of this and certain other pieces of lab equipment must still be maintained, loss or theft must still be reported, and the owner must still allow audits of their records and equipment to be made.

== Additional images ==
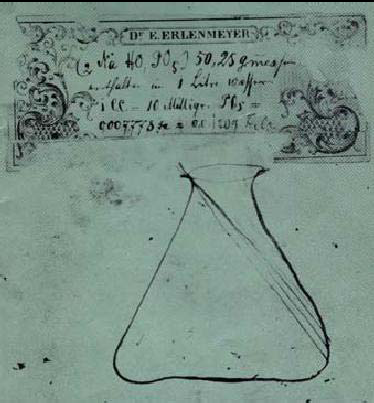
Original drawing of the Erlenmeyer flask

Different styles of Erlenmeyer flask

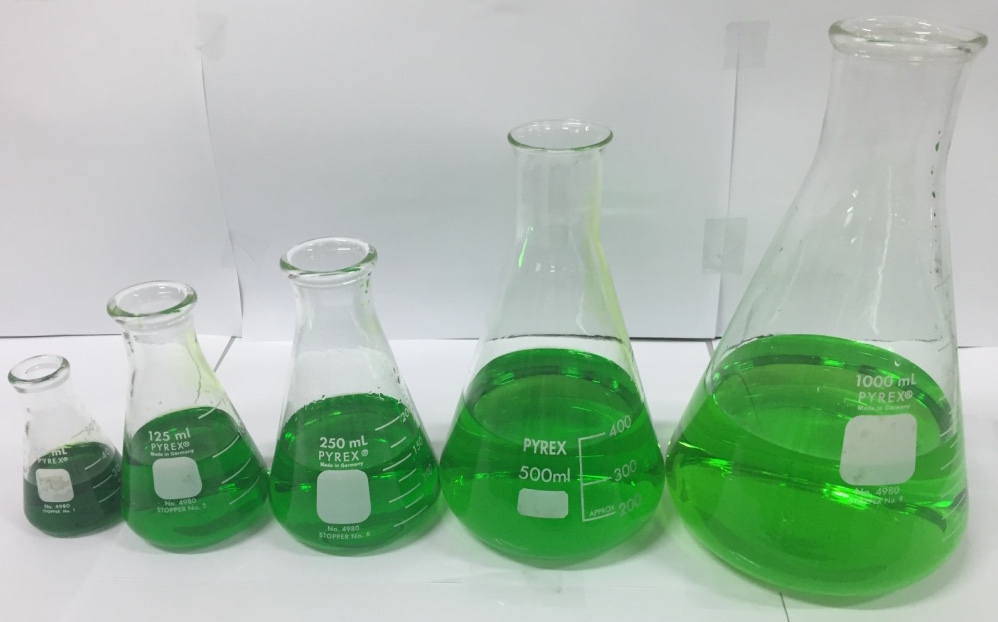
Different sizes of Erlenmeyer flask

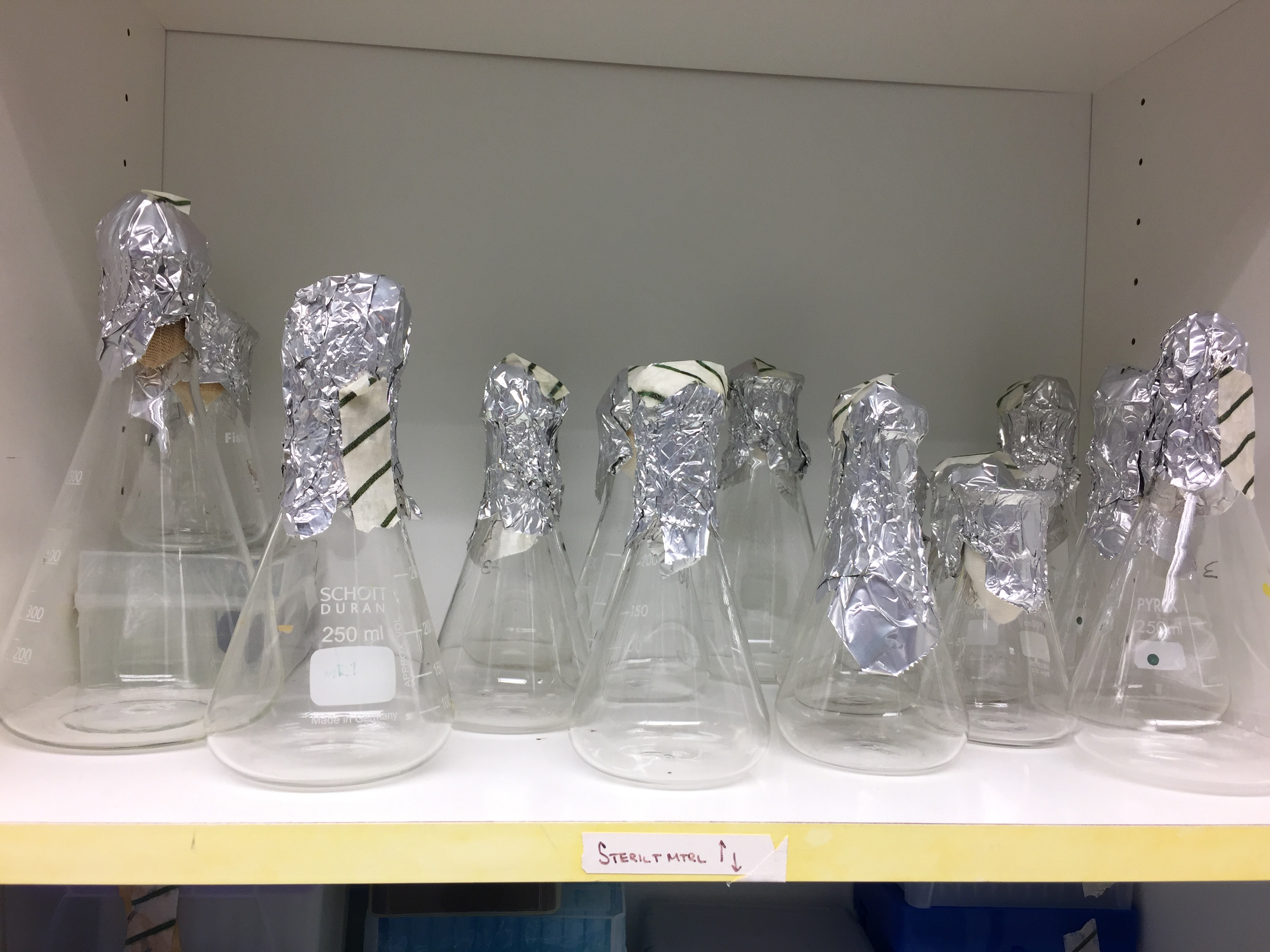
Autoclaved sterile Erlenmeyer flasks covered with aluminium foil

== See also ==
- Chemex
- Fernbach flask
- Fleaker
- Florence flask
- Test tube
