= Auguste Fernbach =

French biologist

- Born: 3 February 1860
- Died: 26 January 1939 (aged 78)
- Known for: Fernbach flask
- Scientific career
- Fields: Biology

Auguste Fernbach (2 March 1860 – 26 January 1939) was a French biologist.

== Life ==
Fernbach worked as a biologist in France. The Fernbach flask is named after him.
