= Liebig condenser =

Laboratory glassware used for cooling gases into liquids

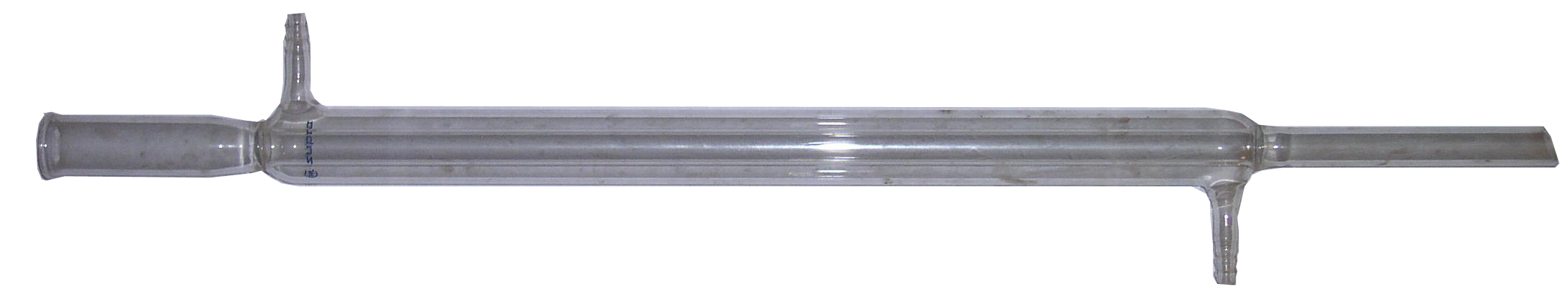
Liebig condenser

The Liebig condenser (/ˈliːbɪɡ/, LEE-big) or straight condenser is a piece of laboratory equipment, specifically a condenser consisting of a straight glass tube surrounded by a water jacket.

In typical laboratory operation, such as distillation, the condenser is clamped to a retort stand in vertical or oblique orientation. The hot vapor of some liquid is introduced at the upper end of the inner tube, and condenses in contact with its colder walls. Water (or some other fluid) is constantly circulated in the jacket to carry away the heat of vaporization released by the condensing vapor, keeping the tube below the liquid's boiling point. The condensed liquid drips out of the lower end of the inner tube.

The Liebig condenser can also be used in reflux or Soxhlet extraction operations, although other condenser types are better suited to those tasks. In this usage, the condenser is held vertically above the recipient with the boiling liquid. The vapor is admitted to the inner tube through the lower end, and the condensed liquid drips back through the same opening, while the upper end of the tube is usually left open to the atmosphere.

== History ==
This type of condenser is named after the German chemist Justus von Liebig, even though he only perfected and popularized it.

The earliest water-cooled laboratory condenser was invented in 1771 by the Swedish-German chemist Christian Weigel (1748–1831). Weigel's condenser consisted of two coaxial tin tubes, which were joined at their lower ends, forming a water jacket, and open at their upper ends. Cold water entered the jacket via an inlet at the bottom and spilled out of the jacket's open upper end. A glass tube carrying vapors from a distillation flask passed through the inner tin tube. Weigel subsequently replaced the inner tin tube with a glass tube, and he devised a clamp to hold the condenser.

However, an anonymous pamphlet published in 1781 claimed that a countercurrent condenser had been conceived in 1770 and tested in 1773. Illustrations in the pamphlet show a retort to which a tube was fitted. The tube carried the retort's vapors through a rectangular box, which acted as a condenser and in which cold water flowed from the condenser's lower end to its upper end—a counter-current condenser.

In 1794, the German pharmacist Johann Friedrich August Göttling (1753–1809), who was a former student of Weigel, improved the design by sealing both ends of the water jacket.

In 1778, in what seems to be an independent invention, Finnish pharmacist Jakob Gadolin (1719–1802) proposed condensers for use in distilleries and in laboratories, consisted of a metal jacket which surrounded the discharge tube from a distillation vessel and through which a countercurrent of cold water flowed.

Also independently of Weigel, Pierre-Isaac Poissonnier (1720–1798), a physician to the king Louis XV of France, published in 1779 a design of a still for producing freshwater from seawater aboard a ship. The apparatus consisted of a retort for boiling the seawater, a tube extending from the retort through a rectangular box filled with flowing cold water, fed by a separate tank.

Liebig himself incorrectly attributed the design to Göttling. Liebig replaced the outer metal wall of Weigel's condenser by a glass tube, and used rubber hoses, instead of metal tubes, to convey water to and from the condenser.

== Design ==
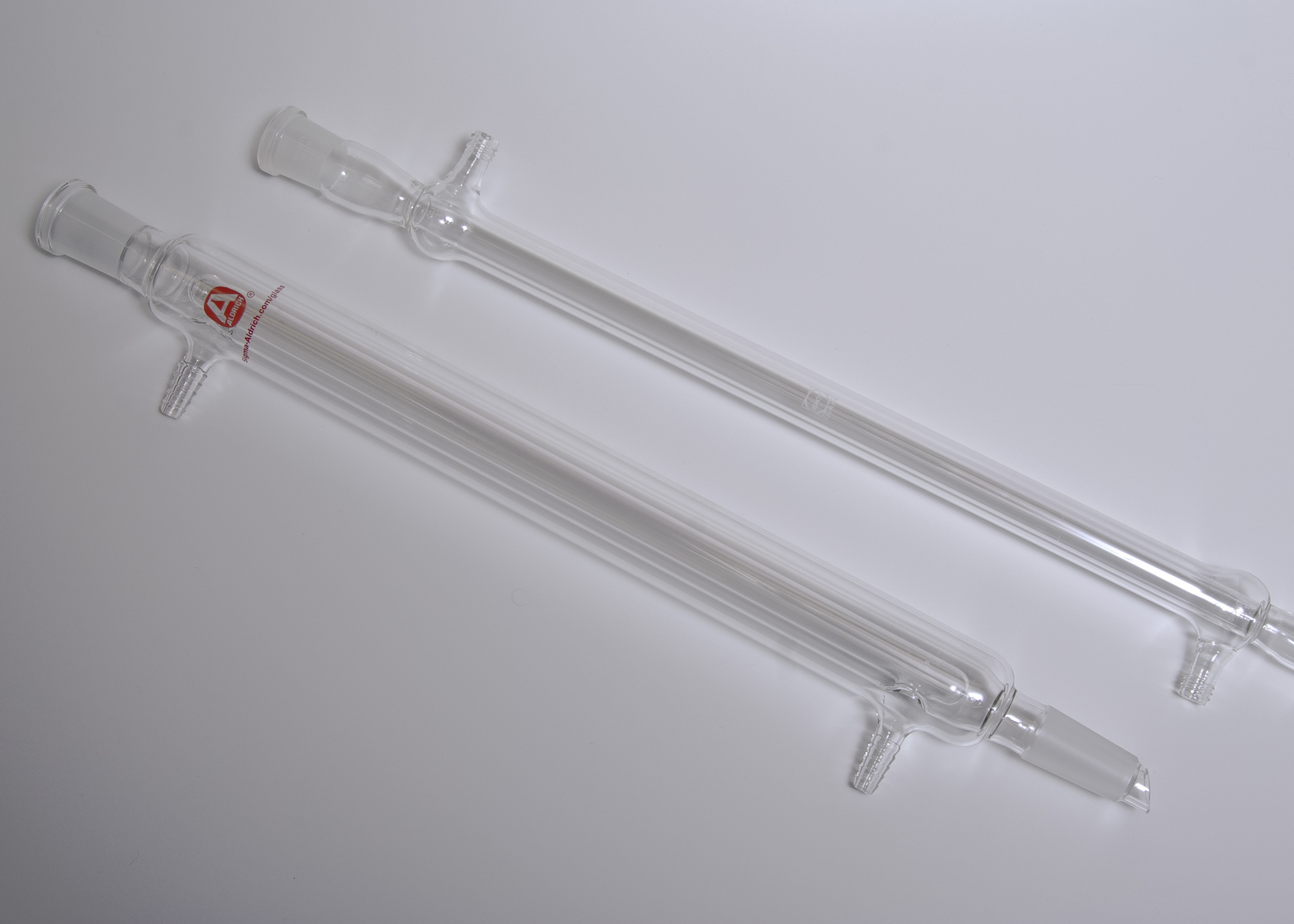
Two modern Liebig condensers, with ground glass joints.

The modern design consists of two concentric straight glass tubes, the inner one being longer and protruding at both extremities. The ends of the outer tube are sealed (usually by a blown glass ring seal), forming a water jacket, and is fitted with side ports near the ends for cooling fluid inflow and outflow. The ends of the inner tube, that carries the vapor and condensed liquid, are open; they are often fitted with ground glass joints for secure and airtight connection to other equipment.

== Efficiency ==
Compared to the simple air-cooled tube condenser of a retort or the head of an alembic, the Liebig condenser is more efficient at removing the heat of condensation and at maintaining a stable low temperature on the condensation surface.
