= Ground glass joint =

Used in laboratories to easily assemble apparatus from parts

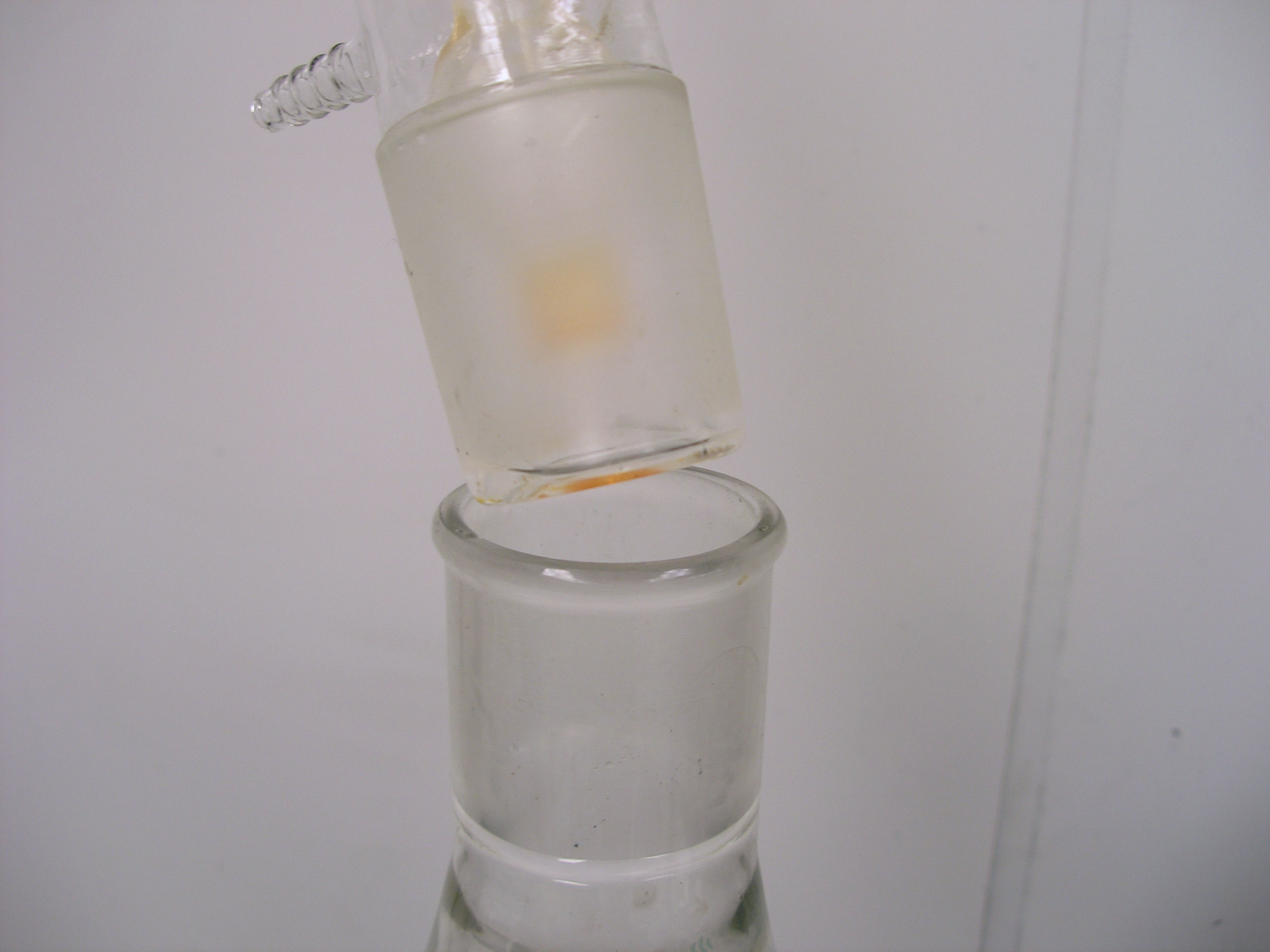
A ST45/50 ground glass inner (male) joint held above an outer (female) joint

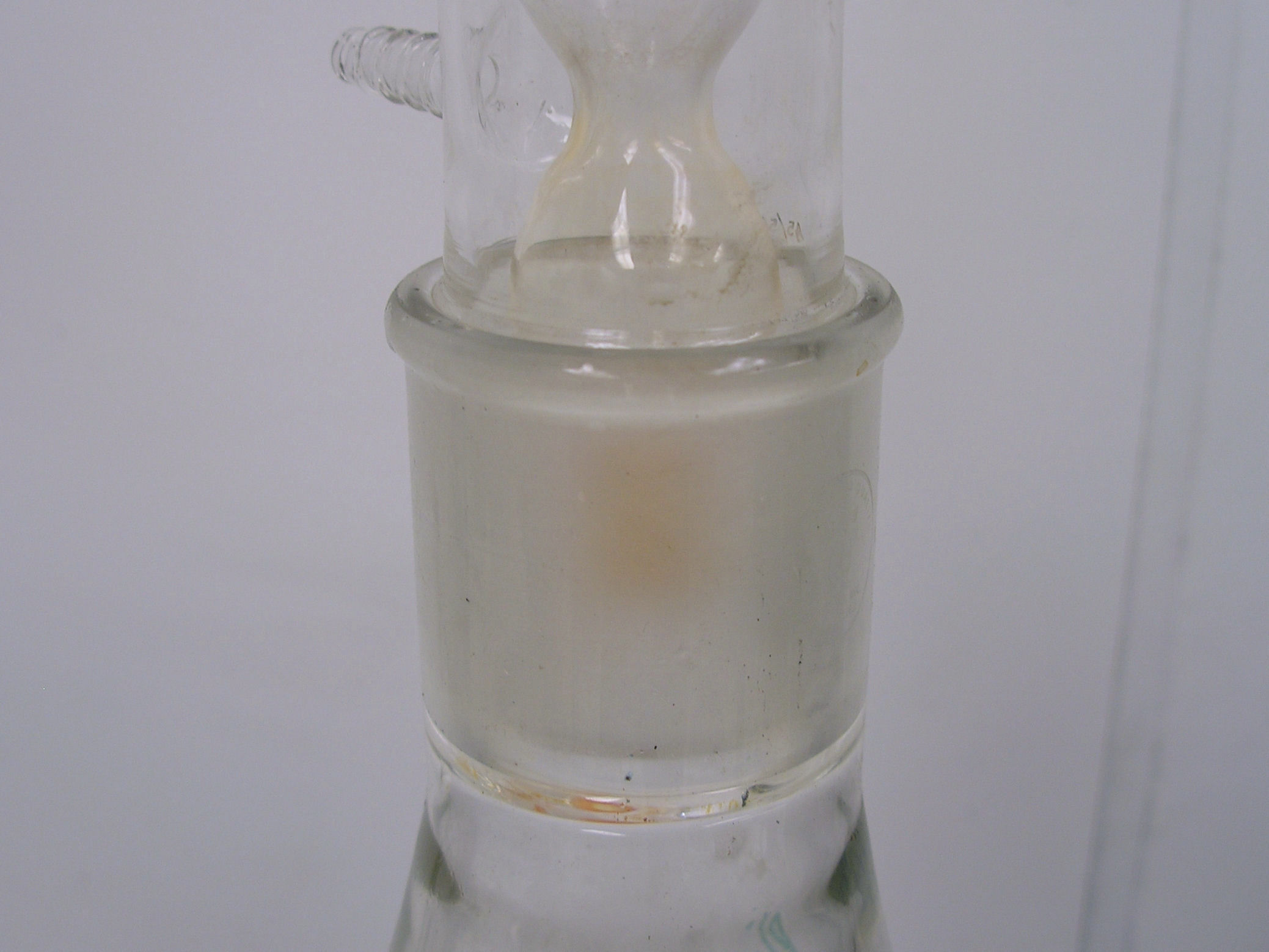
The same joint, closed

Ground glass joints are used in laboratories to quickly and easily fit leak-tight apparatus together from interchangeable commonly available parts. For example, a round bottom flask, Liebig condenser, and oil bubbler with ground glass joints may be rapidly fitted together to reflux a reaction mixture. This is a large improvement compared with older methods of custom-made glassware, which was time-consuming and expensive, or the use of less chemical resistant and heat resistant corks or rubber bungs and glass tubes as joints, which took time to prepare as well.

One of the glassware items to be joined would have an inner (or male) joint with the ground glass surface facing outward and the other would have an outer (or female) joint of a correspondingly fitting taper with the ground glass surface facing inward. To connect the hollow inner spaces of the glassware components, ground glass joints are hollow on the inside and open at the ends, except for stoppers.

== History ==
Crude versions of conically tapered ground glass joints have been made for quite a while, particularly for stoppers for glass bottles and retorts. Crude glass joints could still be made to seal well by grinding the two parts of a joint against each other using an abrasive grit, but this led to variations between joints and they would not seal well if mated to a different joint.

During the 1920s efforts to standardise joints began, and some manufacturers started to produce joints that were standardised, but only within their own products lines. Commercial standards for joints began to appear around 1930 which allowed interchangeability of parts between different manufacturers. A notable proponent of this standardisation was Fritz Friedrichs. These days, ground glass joints can be precisely ground to a reproducible taper or shape, and joints of the same specification are reliably interchangeable.

== Joint types ==
Two general types of ground glass joints are fairly commonly used: joints which are slightly conically tapered and ball and socket joints (sometimes called spherical joints).

=== Conically tapered joints ===
Standard taper symbol

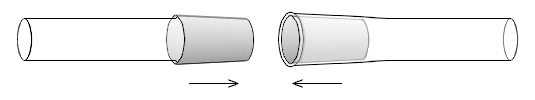
Conically tapered ground glass joints. Inner (male) joint (cone) shown on the left and outer (female) joint (socket) shown on the right. Ground glass surfaces are shown with gray shading. By assembling them in the direction of the arrows, they can be joined.

The conically tapered ground glass joints typically have a 1:10 taper and are often labeled with a symbol ST, consisting of a capital T overlaid on a capital S, meaning "standard taper". This symbol is followed by a number, a slash, and another number. The first number represents the outer diameter (OD) in millimeters at the widest point of the inner (male) joint. The second number represents the ground glass length of the joint in millimeters. Internationally the ISO sizes are used with 14/23, 19/26 and 24/29 very common in research laboratories, with 24/29 the most common. In the US the ASTM sizes (equal to the now obsolete Commercial Standard 21) are used with common sizes being 14/20, 19/22, 24/40 and somewhat 29/42. In the US 24/40 is most common.

Full-length	Medium-length	Short-length	International-length
ASTM E 676-02 (obsolete CS 21)			ISO 383 (ISO K-6 series)
5/12	5/8	5/13	
7/25	7/15	7/10	7/16
10/30	10/18	10/7 and 10/10	10/19
12/30	12/18	12/10	12/21
14/35	14/20	14/10	14/23
19/38	19/22	19/10	19/26
			21/28
24/40	24/25	24/12	24/29
29/42	29/26	29/12	29/32
34/45	34/28	34/12	34/35
40/50	40/35	40/12	40/38
45/50		45/12	45/40
50/50		50/12	50/42
55/50		55/12	
60/50		60/12	60/46
71/60		71/15	71/51
			85/55
			100/60
103/60			

=== Ball-and-socket joints ===
For ball-and-socket joints (also known as spherical joints), the inner joint is a ball and the outer joint is a socket, both having holes leading to the interior of their respective tube ends, to which they are fused. The ball tip is a hemisphere with a ground-glass surface on the outside, which fits inside of the socket, where the ground glass surface is on the inside. This type of joint separates freely and must be held together with a clamp. Ball-and-socket joints are labeled with a size code consisting of a number, a slash, and another number. The first number represents the outer diameter in millimeters of the ball at its base or the inner diameter in millimeters at the tip of the socket, in both cases where the diameters are their maximum in the joints.

The second number represents the inner diameter of the hole in the middle of the ball or socket, which leads to the inner diameter of the tube fused to the joint.

Ground-glass ball (left) and socket (right) joints. The ground-glass surfaces are shown with increased shading. By putting them together in the direction of the arrows, they can be joined, with some grease applied to the ground-glass surfaces.

If the angle standard taper fittings make with glassware is not perfectly set, the glass is extremely rigid and brittle, presenting a fracture risk on some setups. A ball and socket joining method allows some flexibility in the mating angles of the pieces being joined, which can be particularly important with heavy flasks or long pieces of glassware that would otherwise be difficult to support and potentially snap under bending loads. A common example of this is the collection flask on a rotary evaporator, whose weight increases significantly as it fills. A ball and socket allows the flask to plumb itself without placing a bending load on the joint. Such a socket might also be used on a larger, but more typical, distillation setup at the head and before the condenser. This allows the long span of the condenser, the non-perfect angle of the receiving bend and the filling flask to be supported more easily as their angle with the still head has a few degrees of positioning freedom.

They can also be found as the necks on pilot plant production flasks, where large volumes and masses are present, and on some Schlenk lines, where the long spans of fine glass benefit from a little flexibility between pieces. Generally, when considering smaller glassware, ball and sockets are far outnumbered by standard tapers.

=== Flat joints ===
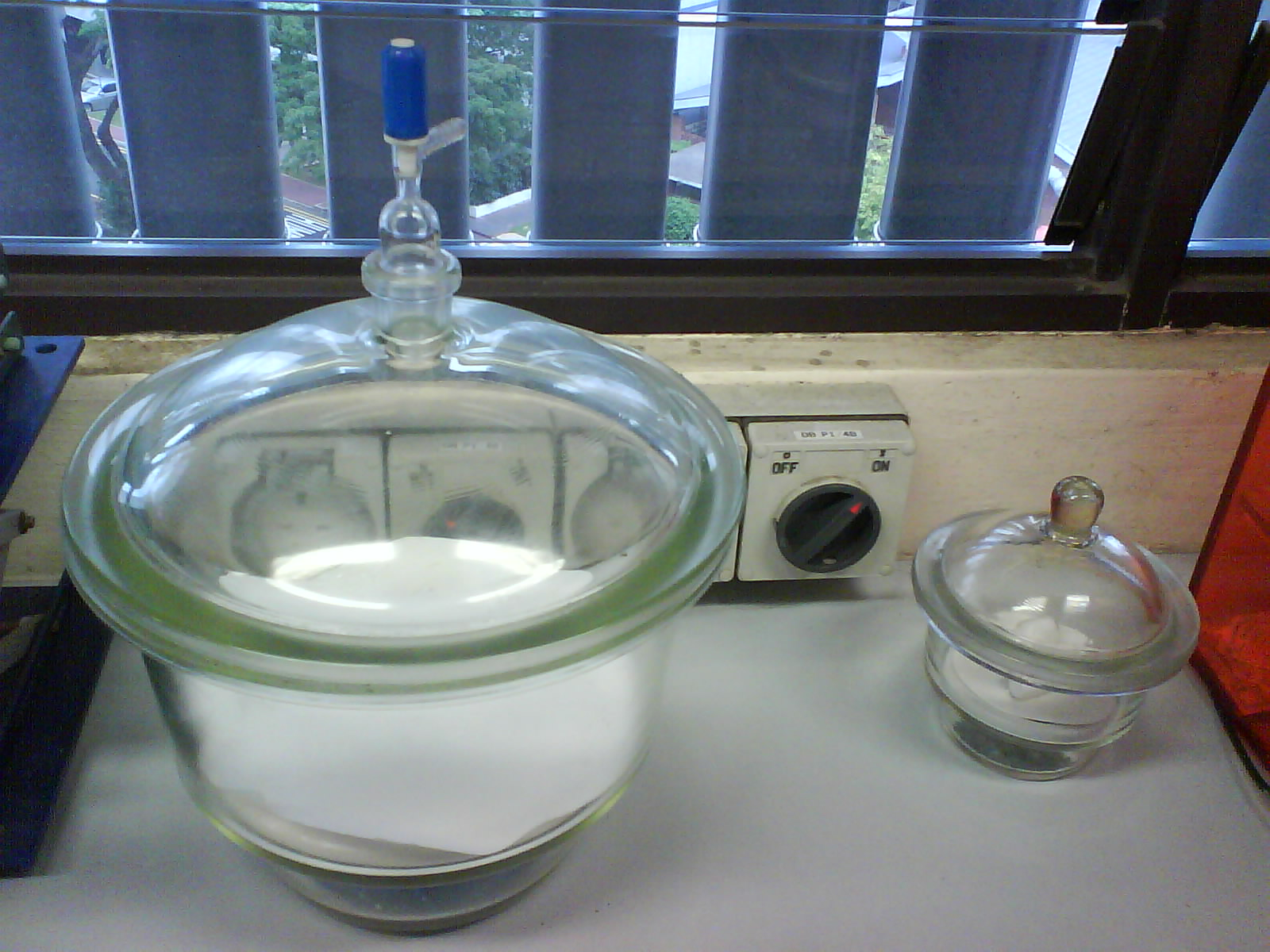
Glass vacuum desiccators use a flat ground-glass joint to seal their wide lids.

For flat joints the edge of a tube is ground flat perpendicular to the tube and pressed against a similar flat surface, with the mating force being applied by an external clamp. The rim of the joint is flared, sometimes into a wide flange, to give a larger surface for the joint to seal over. Aside from joints using a gasket or O-ring, this is the only type of ground-glass joint used for very large diameters, since at those scales conical joints become impractical to manufacture and are prone to binding. Flat joints are mostly seen on large columns and reaction vessels, although they are used in some smaller applications such as flasks with removable lids. Glass vacuum desiccators use a flat ground-glass joint to seal their wide lids.

== Connections ==
=== Threaded connections ===
Round slightly spiral threaded connections are possible on tubular ends of glass items. Such glass threading is more easily and commonly employed on the outside, but can also face the inside. In use, glass threading is screwed into or onto non-glass threaded material such as plastic. Threads are usually created by forming the glass while hot, which results in a smooth finish. Glass vials typically have outer threaded glass openings onto which caps can be screwed on. Bottles and jars in which chemicals are sold, transported, and stored usually have threaded openings facing the outside and matching non-glass caps or lids. Tapered joints can include an external thread for a plastic nut with an O-ring to seal the joint, Rodaviss joints also include a split ring that allows the nut to be used to separate the joint.

=== Hose connections ===
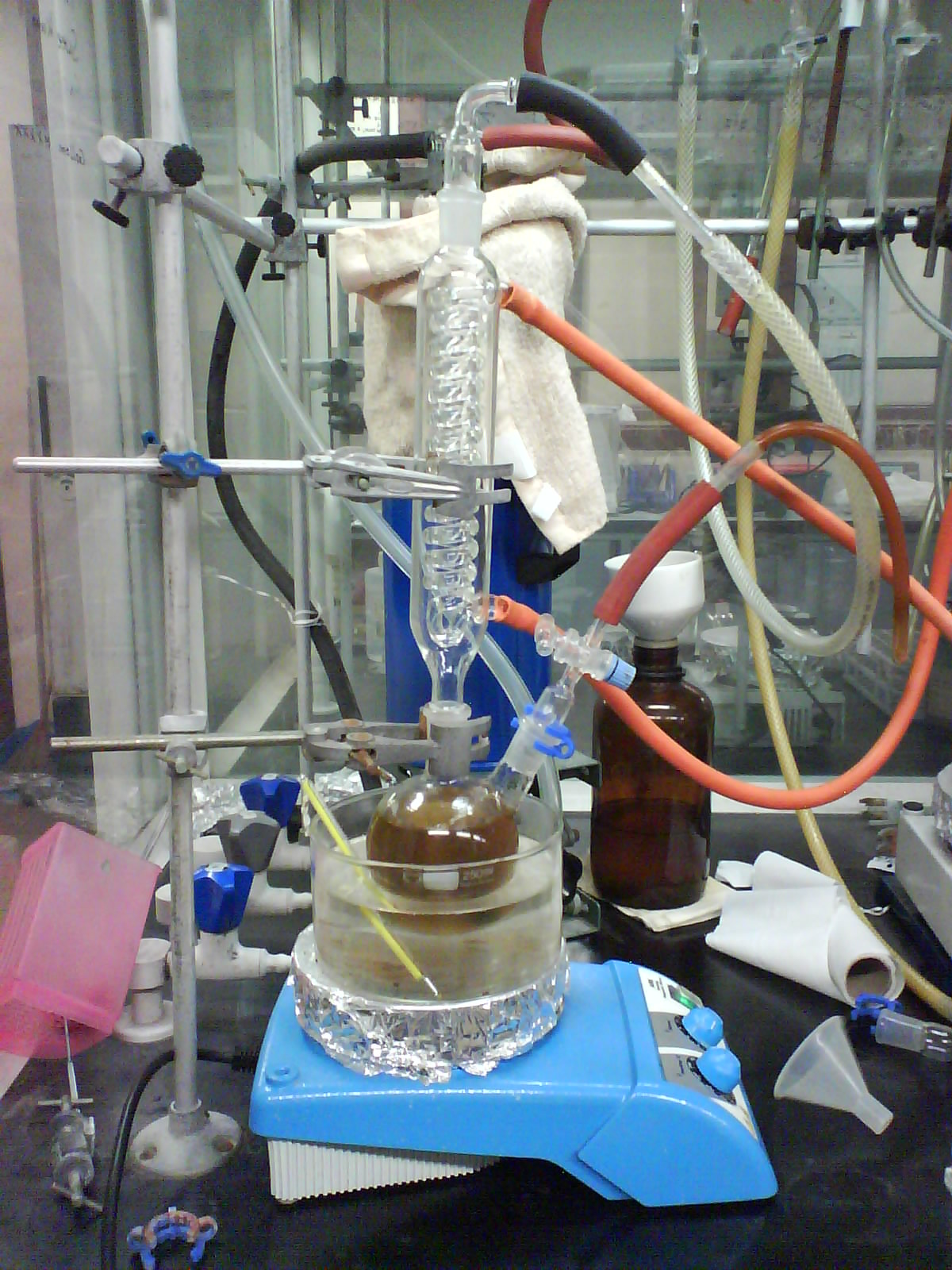
A reflux set-up with conically tapered ground glass joints connecting the coil condenser with an adapter to allow inert gas (nitrogen or argon) to leave the vessel (top) and two-necked flask. Another ground glass joint connects the second neck to another adapter for introduction of an inert gas.

Laboratory glassware, such as Buchner flasks and Liebig condensers, may have tubular glass tips intended for insertion into a hose, often with barbs to retain the hose, and may be tapered to accept a wider range of hose diameters. These are typical for connection of cooling water, vacuum lines, gas transport, or drains. A special clip may be placed around the mated hose to prevent it from slipping off the connector.

A number of brands, including Quickfit, have begun using threaded connections for hose barbs. This allows the barb to be unscrewed from the glassware, the hose pushed on and the setup screwed back together. This helps avoid accidentally breaking the glass and potentially doing serious harm to the chemist, as will sometimes occur when pushing the hoses directly onto the glass.

=== Adapters ===
For either standard taper joints or ball-and-socket joints, inner and outer joints with the same numbers are made to fit together. When the joint sizes are different, ground glass adapters may be available (or made) to place in between to connect them. Special clips or pinch clamps may be placed around the joints to hold them in place.

Round-bottom flasks often have one or more conically tapered ground glass joint openings, or necks. Conventionally, these joints at the flask necks are outer joints. Other adapters, such as distillation heads and vacuum adapters, are made with joints that fit in with this convention. If a flask or other container has an extra outer ground-glass joint on it, which needs to be closed off for an experiment, there are often conically tapered inner ground-glass stoppers for that purpose. In some cases, small hook-like glass protrusions may be fused onto the rest of the glass item near a joint to allow an end loop of a small spring to be attached, so the spring helps keep joints temporarily together. The use of a special very small size of conically tapered fitting for glass, plastic, or metal parts called a Luer fitting or adapter has become more widespread. Originally, Luer fittings were used to connect the hub of a needle to a syringe. Where the use of ground glass presents a problem, as in the production or distillation of diazomethane (which may explode on contact with rougher surfaces), equipment with smooth glass joints may be used.

=== Joint clips ===
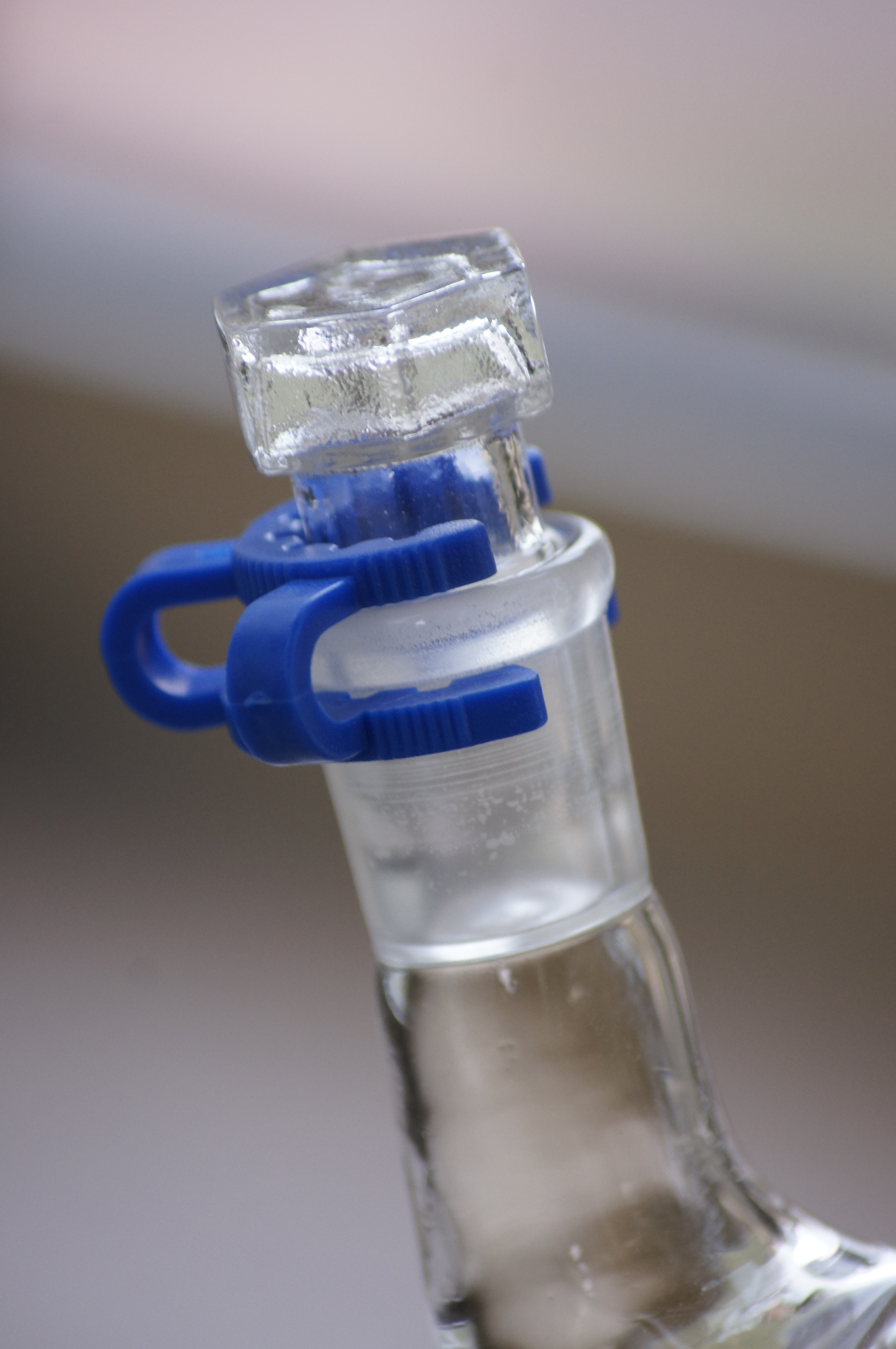
A keck clamp in use

The handling of the high-grade stainless steel joint clips for conical ground glass joints

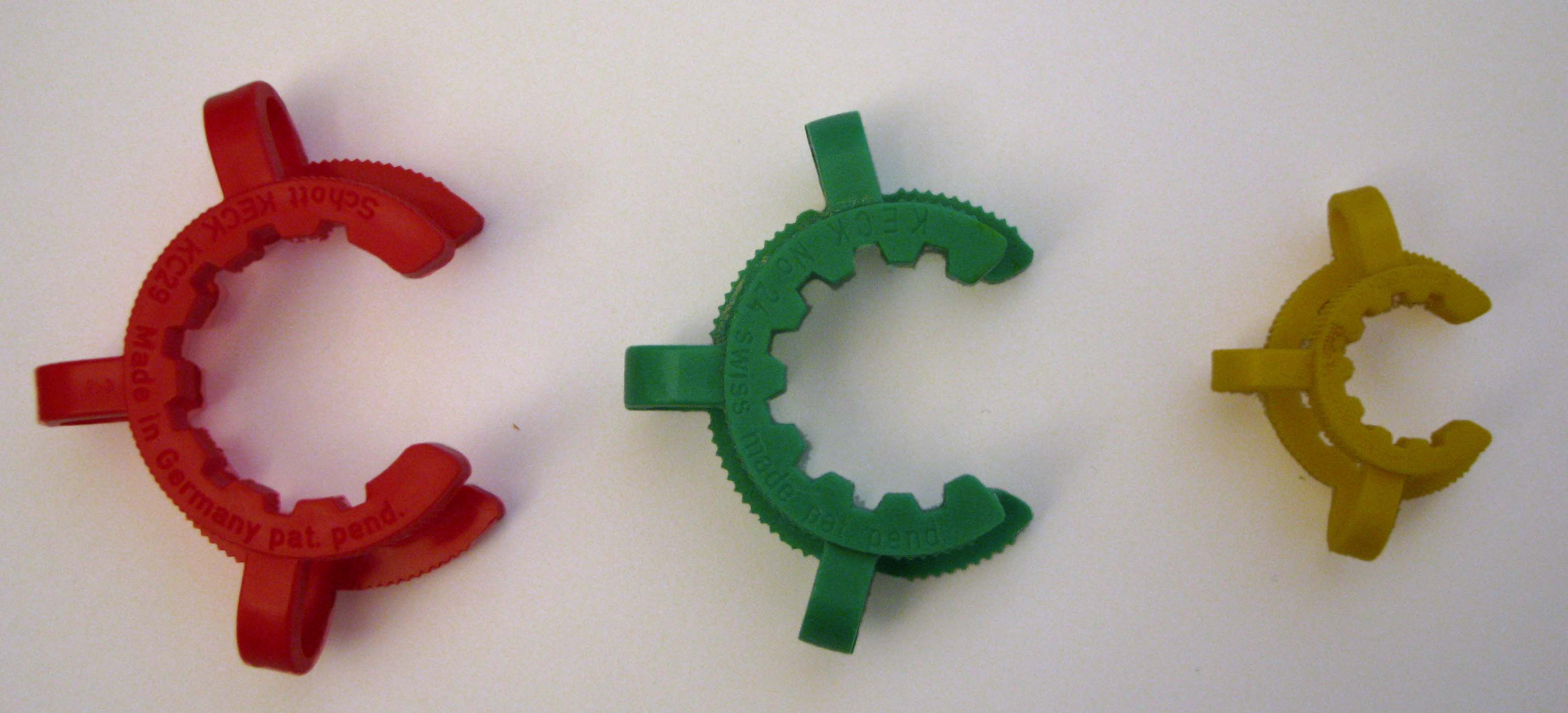
Plastic joint clips made of polyoxymethylene for holding cone and socket joints together, in three sizes: red (29), green (24), yellow (14)

To prevent a joint from separating during a reaction process, various types of plastic or metal clips or springs can be used to secure the two sides together. They are available in a variety of materials for different temperature and chemical environments.

Patented in 1984 by Hermann Keck, plastic joint clips are usually made of polyacetal, and are colored according to joint sizes. Polyacetal melts at a reasonably low temperature (around 175 °C) and begins to soften around 140 °C. As glassware temperatures are recommended up to 250 °C, care needs to be taken that clips made from this material are not being used to hold glass together that will get this hot. Typical problem areas include a flask over the plate (which may drop off the end of the column as it heats) and the connection the condenser makes to the still head (which will reach high temperatures and may allow the condenser to fall off). As such, different clips should be used at these points or the glassware should be clamped so that these elements can't slide apart or don't need the clip. Polyacetal clips have another problem: the material is strongly affected by corrosive gases. This effect can be so dramatic that the clip will fall apart in minutes of exposure to minute quantities leaking through greased, ground tapers. Importantly, this failure mode is sudden and without warning.

PTFE joint clips are sometimes used, as its recommended temperature peak matches that of most practical chemistry work. Its highly inert nature also makes it immune to degradation around the corrosive gases. However, it is both expensive and will begin producing perfluoroisobutylene if heated beyond its specified temperature. Care must be taken to avoid this, given the level of risk the result presents. The same is true of using Krytox and chemically resistant Molykote (PTFE thickened, fluoro based) oils and greases for glassware seals. A high-grade stainless steel joint clip is a final option. Naturally, this can withstand the entire temperature spectrum of borosilicate glass and is reasonably inert. Lower grades of stainless steel are still rapidly attacked in the presence of the corrosive gases and the clips themselves are often as expensive as PTFE.

Some glassware features barbs (devil's horns, Viking helmet) protruding from the sides of the tapers. Small stainless steel springs are used on these to hold the joints together. The use of springs is beneficial when dealing with positive pressures, as they apply enough force for the glass to operate, but will open the taper if an unexpected excursion occurs. This method is considered quite old fashioned, but is still used on some of the most well known and high-end glassware available.

For situations where the simple spring action of metal wires or plastic is not strong enough or are not convenient for other reasons, screwed clamps can be used to hold joints together. Plastic collars are often used on microscale equipment.

== Hermetic sealing ==
A thin layer of PTFE material or grease is usually applied to the ground-glass surfaces to be connected, and the inner joint is inserted into the outer joint so that the ground-glass surfaces of each are next to each other. This helps provide a good seal and prevents the joint from seizing, allowing the parts to be disassembled easily. Although the silicone grease used as a sealant and a lubricant for interconnecting ground glass joints is normally assumed to be chemically inert, some compounds have resulted from unintended reactions with silicones.

== Frozen joints ==
Sometimes conical ground glass joints can lock together, preventing the user from rotating them. This is known as freezing or locking, and may occur for a variety of reasons:

- Lack of lubrication between the two glass surfaces. If organic solvents come into contact with the joint, they can slowly dissolve the grease, leaving a dry glass-glass surface.
- Exposure to a strong base (hydroxide, phosphate, etc.) may dissolve some of the SiO_{2} surface, generating silicic acid (H_{4}SiO_{4} / Si(OH)_{4})
- Solids from reaction mixtures
- Allowing sealed vessels to cool, which creates a vacuum within the joint
- Strong differential heating or cooling of the joint components, which can cause shrink-fitting

Frozen joints may be removed by working solvent into the joint while rocking the stopper, heating the outer joint, or cooling the inner stopper. The last two methods employ the property of thermal expansion to create a small space between the two surfaces. There are also specialized glassblowing tools to unfreeze the joint.

== See also ==
- Closure (container)
