= Laboratory drying rack =

Board for hanging and draining laboratory glassware

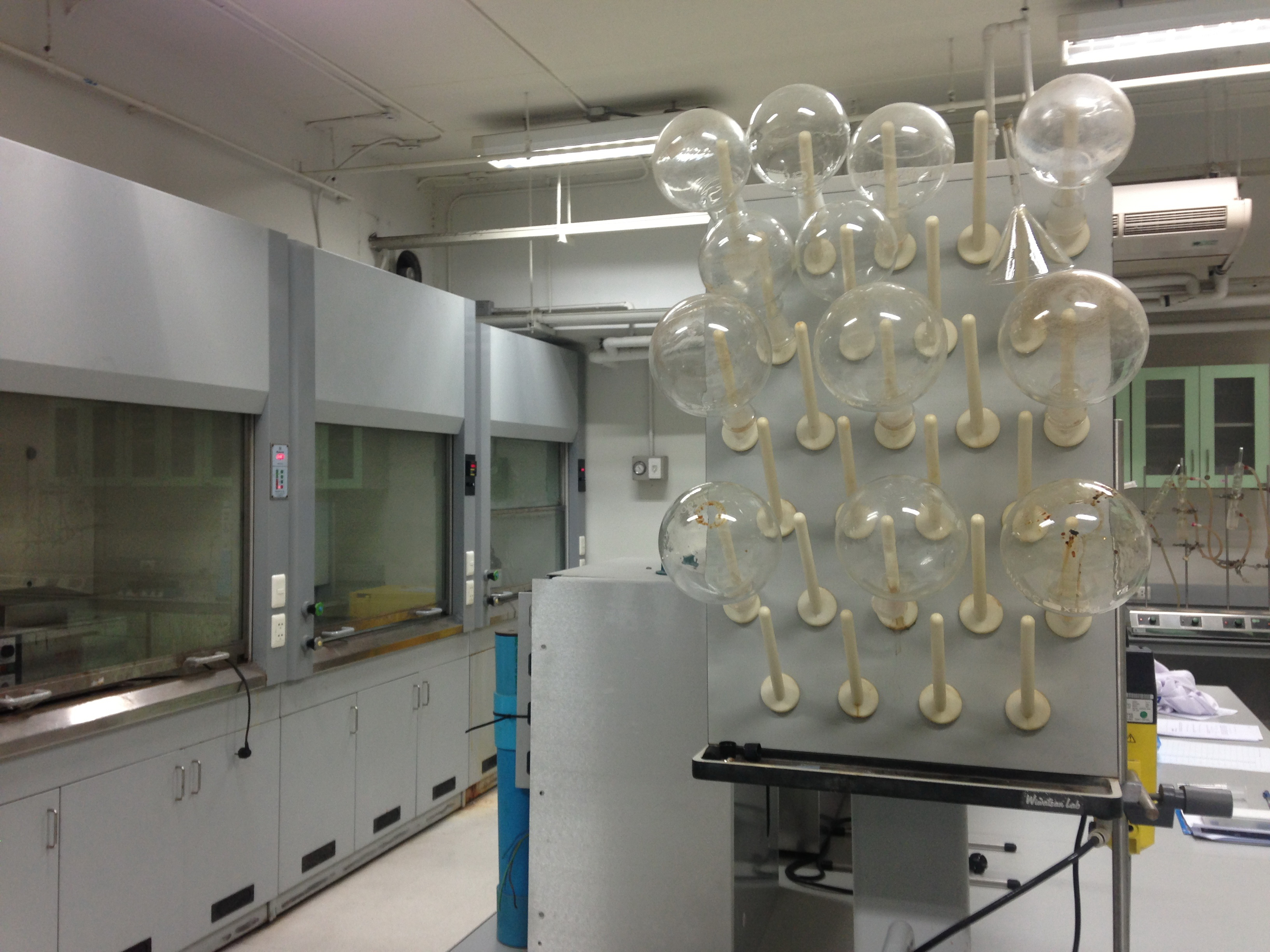
A laboratory drying rack can be used to dry large flasks

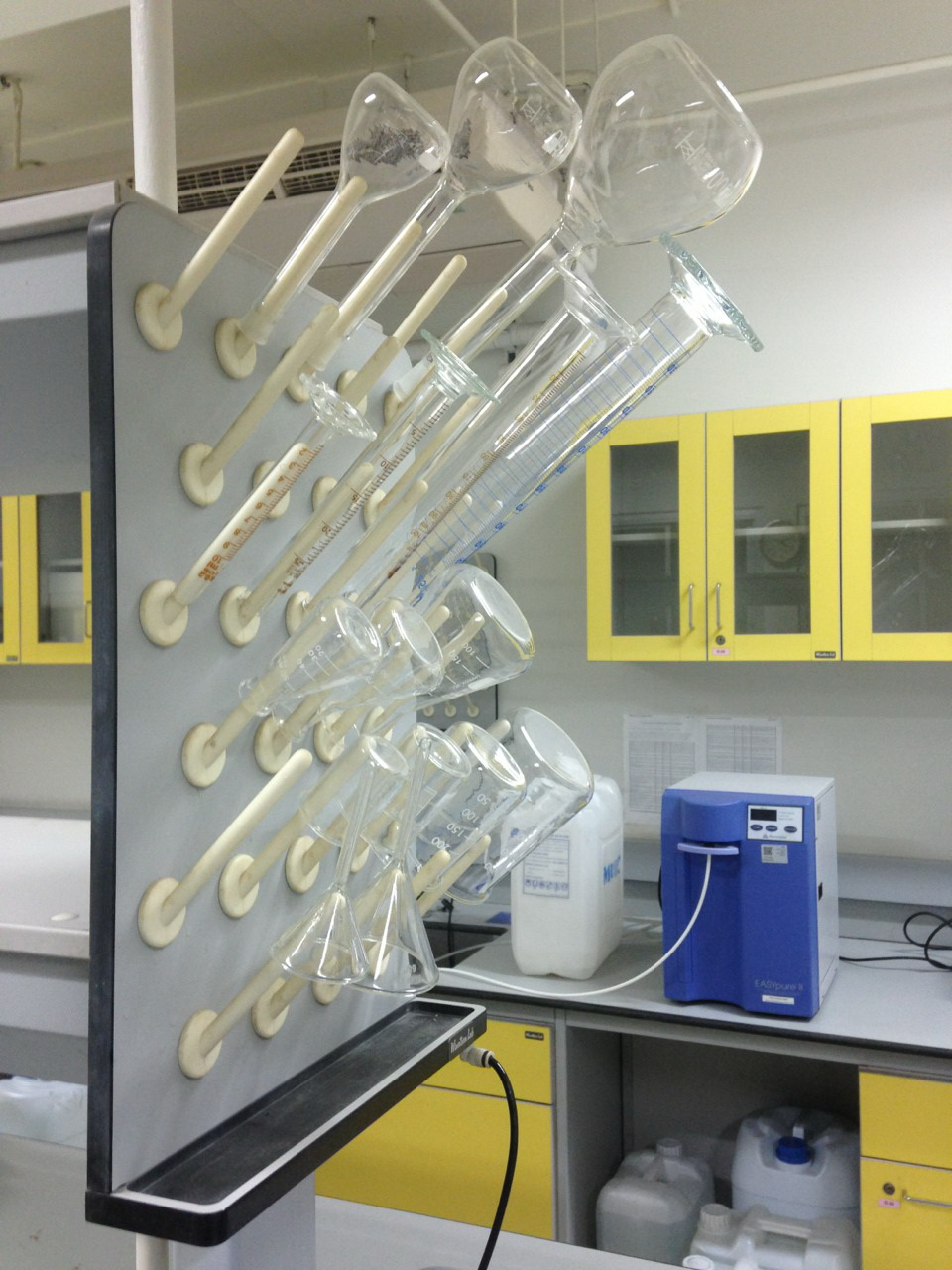
A drying rack can capably contain and dry various types of laboratory glassware.

Laboratory drying rack is a pegboard for hanging and draining glassware in a laboratory. It is available in different varieties and sizes. It can be used for different materials of glassware in the laboratory room such as funnels, pipettes, mixing balls, slides, bottle stoppers, tubing and so on. In addition to that, the pegs on the drying rack are easily removable and replaceable in order to maintain the cleaning of the lab racks to avoid contamination with other apparatus used on the same rack. Any common laboratory needs to have at least two or three drying racks per lab.

== Types ==
Laboratory drying rack can be mainly categorized into three major types including stainless steel laboratory drying racks, epoxy laboratory drying racks, and acrylic laboratory drying racks.

=== Stainless steel ===
Stainless steel laboratory drying rack, which is also known as a 'Mod-Rack' pegboard, is the drying rack made of stainless steel that uses to drain laboratory accessories. The examples of stainless steel laboratory drying rack are flask holders, soap dispensers, paper towel dispensers, glove box holders, drain shelves. Stainless steel pegboard installation is very easy and quick to set up with basic hand equipment's, and it does not damage the wall as mounting brackets and hardware are being used.

=== Epoxy ===
Epoxy laboratory drying racks are the most common type of drying rack that are used among university labs and science classrooms in many high schools. Epoxy drying racks are mounted directly to a wall or other solid structures which can be set up with basic hand tools and power tools. They are easily installed by using wall anchors and other strong fasteners due to their small weight. Typical installation is to drill holes, one at each corner, and to use the mounting points in order to fix it to the wall.

=== Acrylic ===
Acrylic laboratory drying racks give a unique feature that other pegboards cannot do. The clear acrylic is transparent, which means that it allows the light to pass through as well as brightening the working area. Acrylic pegboards are mostly in the place where there are no lights, or to be done in dim areas. Like epoxy pegboards, acrylic laboratory pegboards are also installed with basic tools and power tools in the same way. However, acrylic pegboards are made up of plastic, so it can be easily scratched as compared to the epoxy and the stainless steel drying rack.

== Usage ==
Laboratory drying rack can contain and dry up various types of laboratory glassware such as beaker, Erlenmeyer flask, volumetric flask, and graduated cylinder.

Laboratory drying rack is usually used to dry up the tube in the laboratory; for example, it can help in drying test tube, boiling tube, and Thiele tube.

In addition, laboratory drying rack can hold many types of flask including round-bottomed flask, Florence flask, kjeldahl flask, pear-shaped flask, retort flask, Schlenk flask, Straus flask, Buchner flask, and Claisen flask.

Moreover, laboratory drying rack can be used to drain other types of laboratory glassware as well. For instance, in terms of funnel, it is used to dry up separating funnel, dropping funnel, filter funnel, and Thistle funnel.

Laboratory drying racks are preferable to the use of towels or compressed air, which can introduce fibers and impurities that can contaminate the solution. It is a more economic approach, than using drying oven which is not that quantitatively clean. It can dry up a lot of glassware in one rack, making it very compact and easy to use.

== Additional images ==
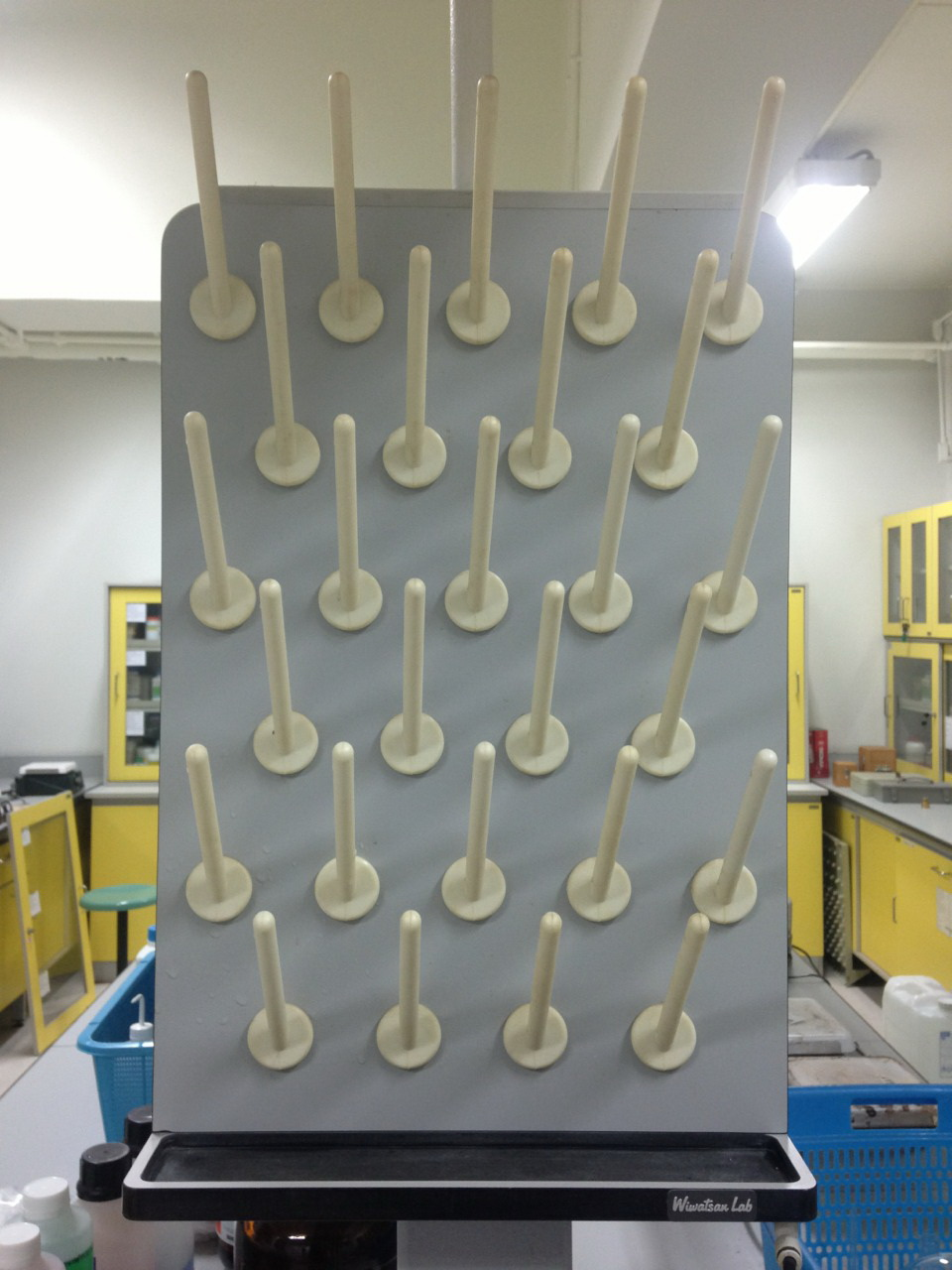

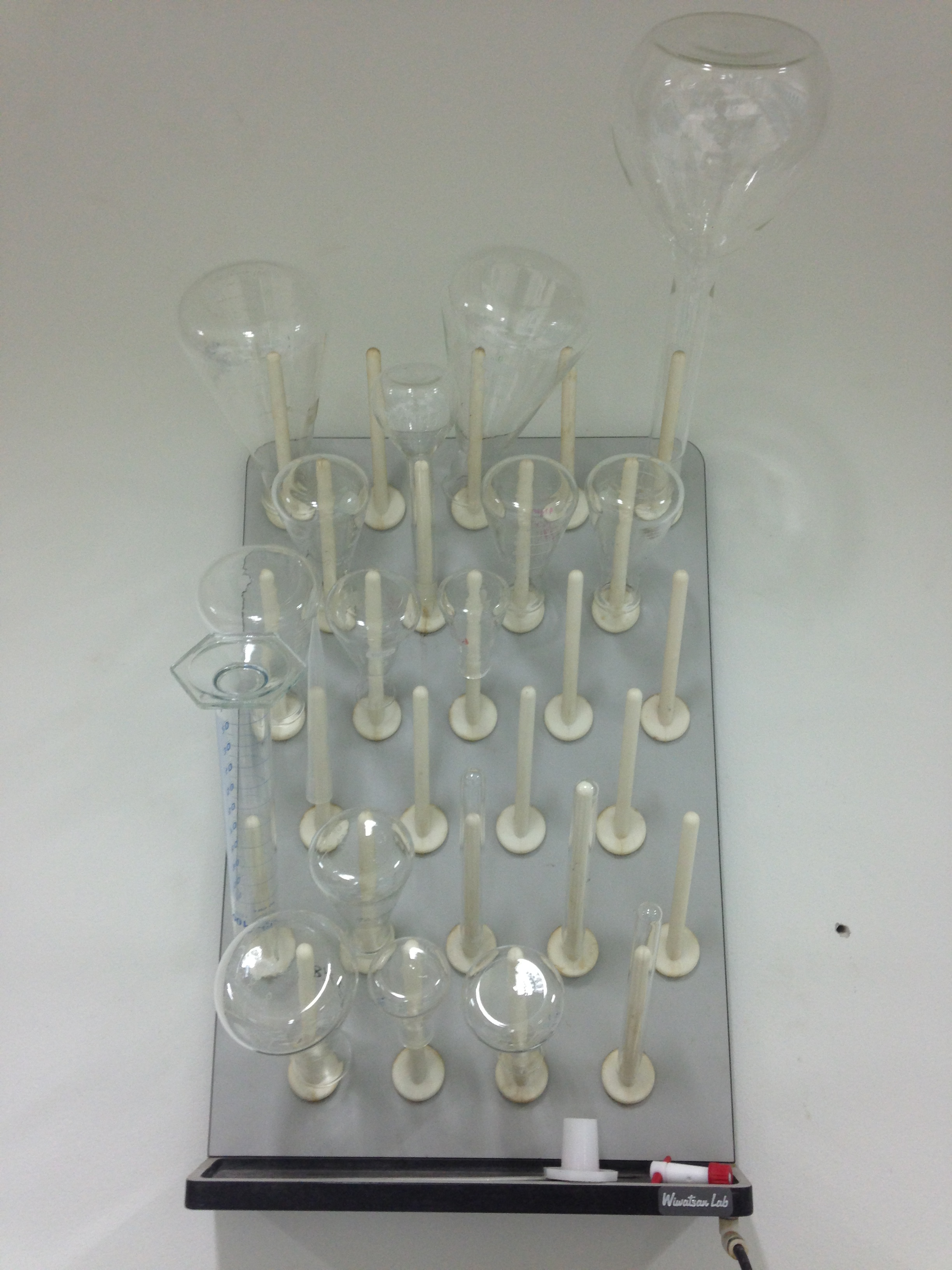

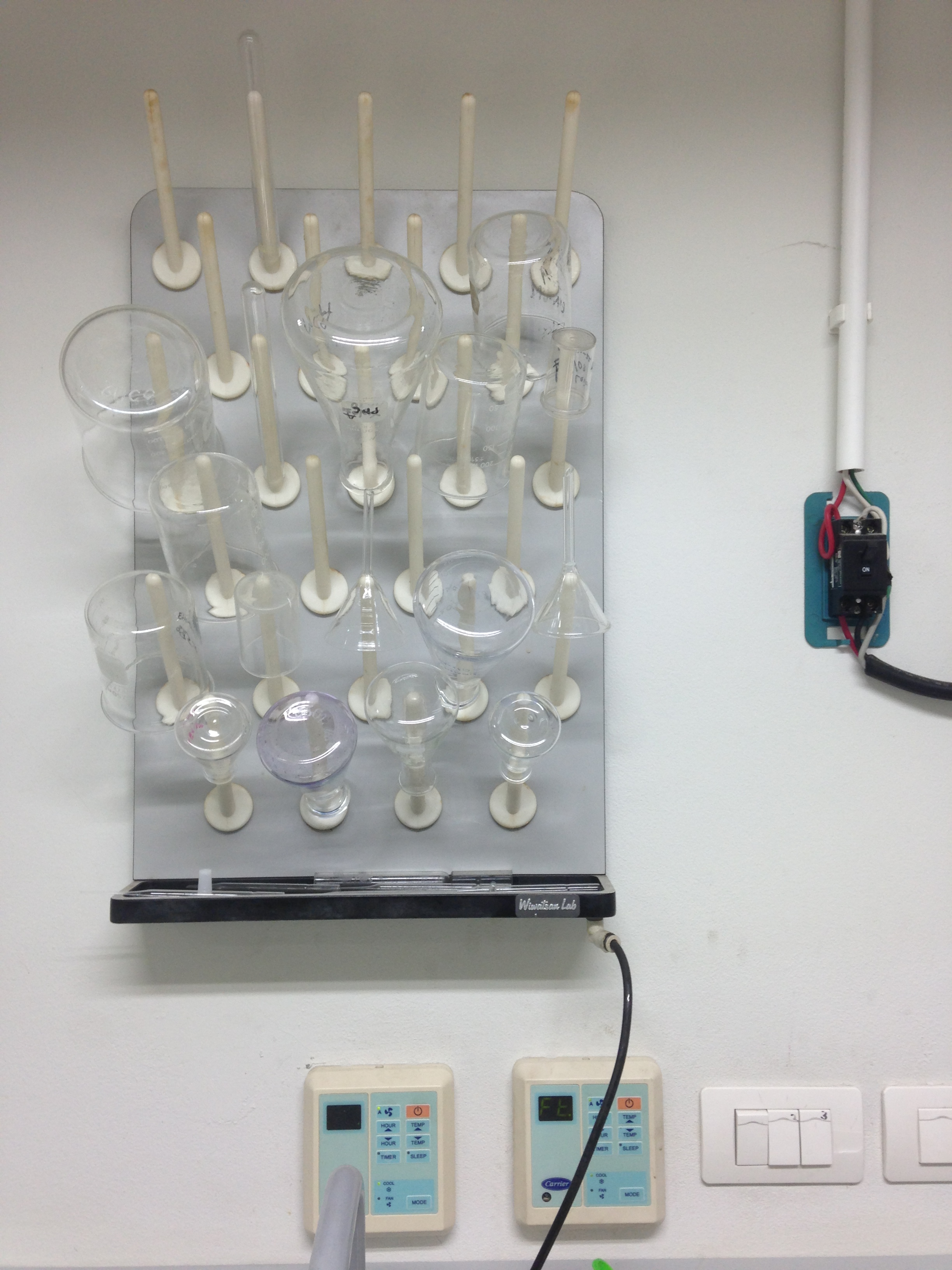

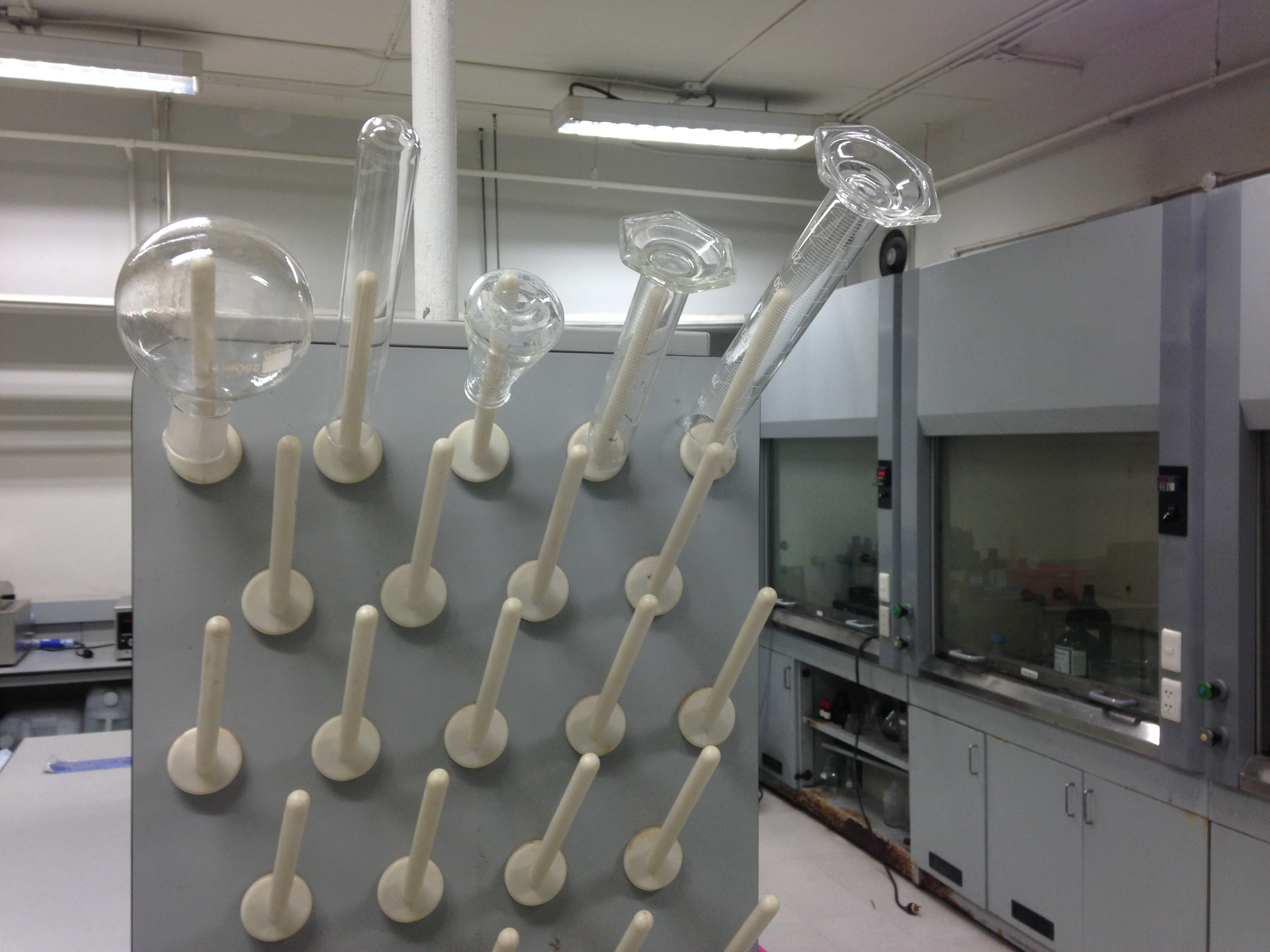

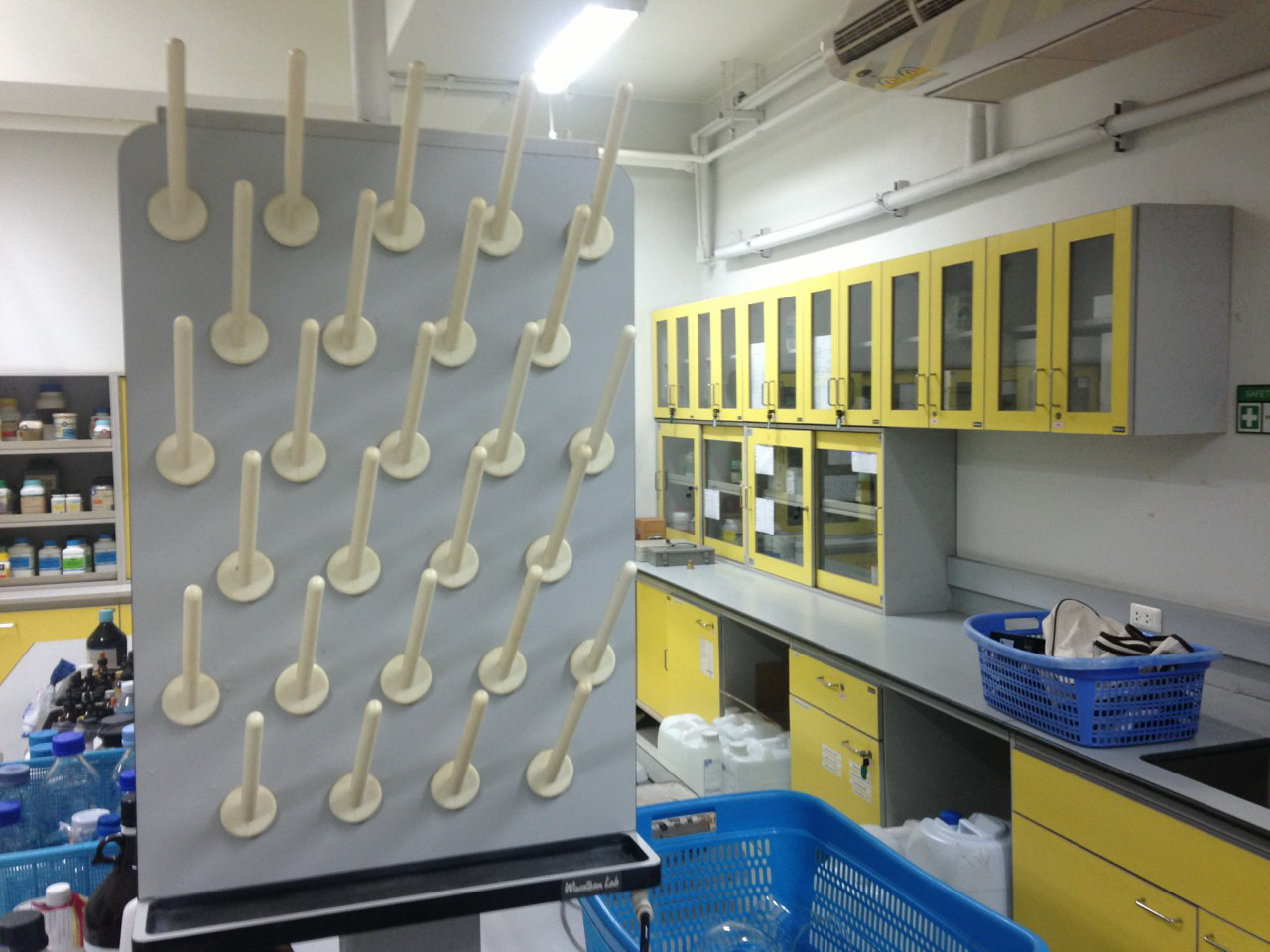

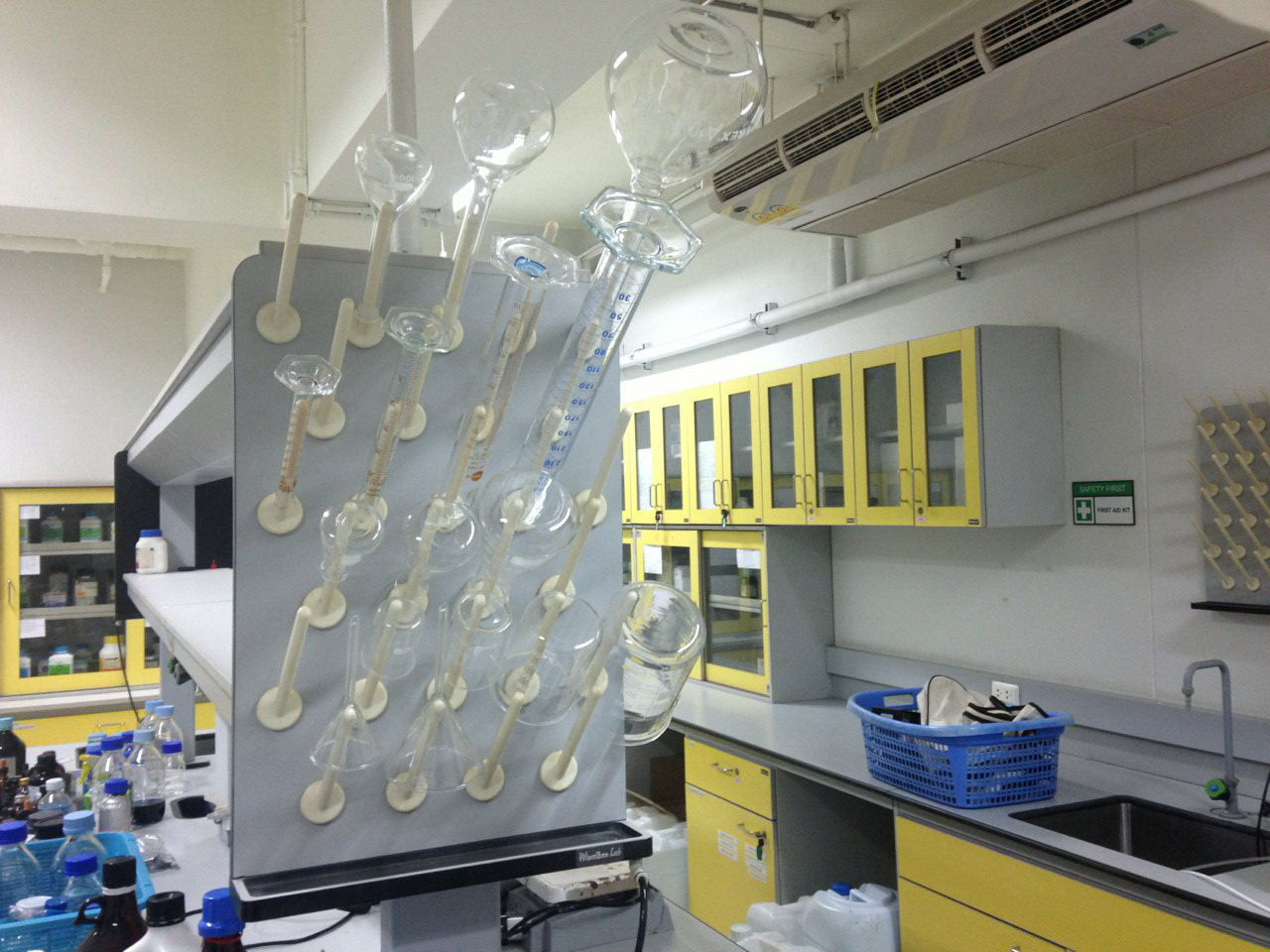

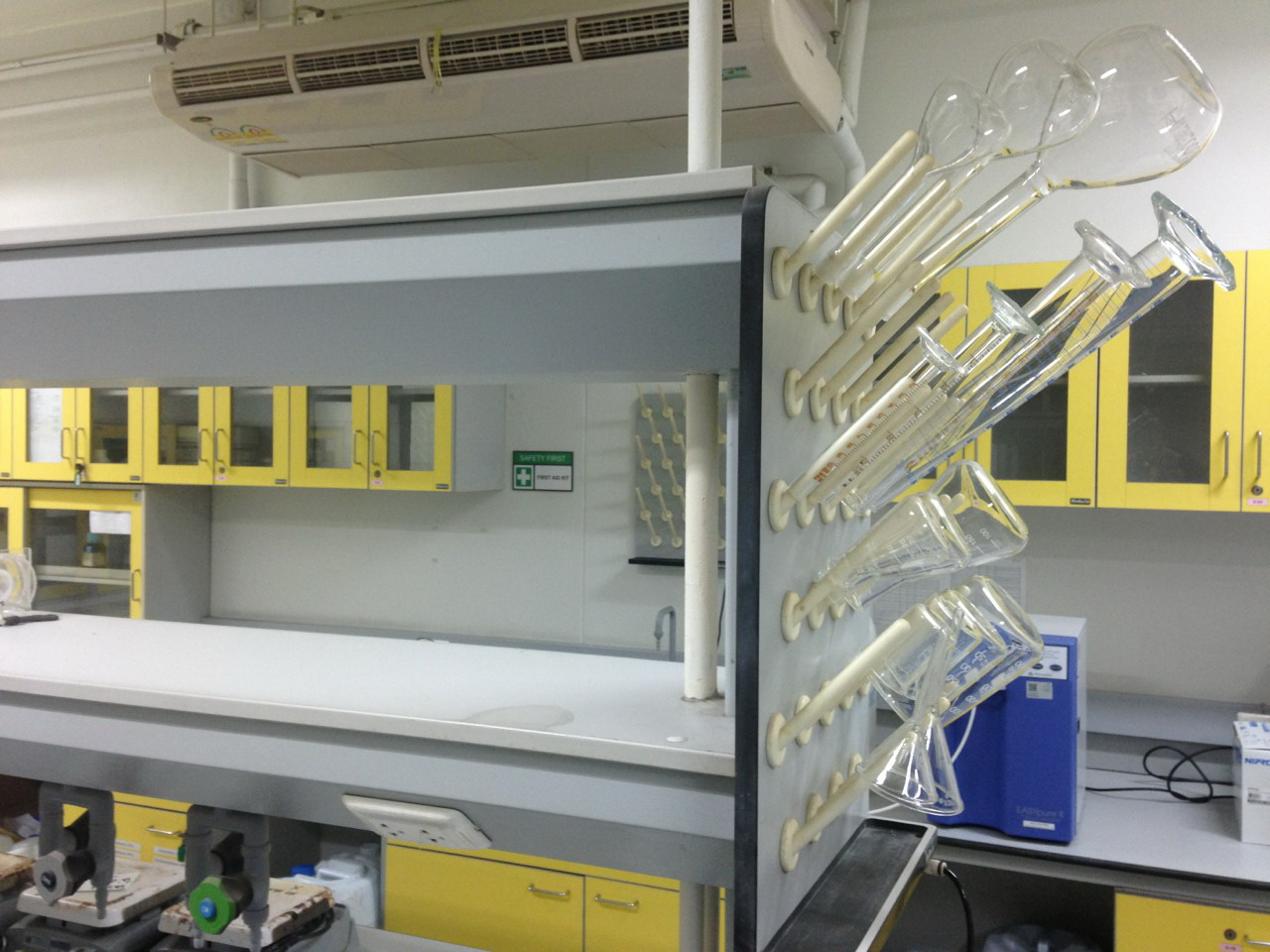
