= Laboratory funnel =

Pipe with a wide top and narrow bottom

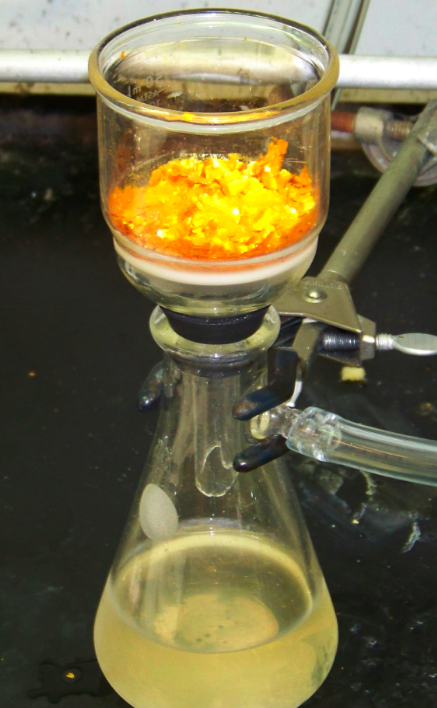
A Büchner funnel with a sintered glass disc

Laboratory funnels are made for chemical laboratory use. Many different kinds of funnel have been designed for specialized applications. Filter funnels, thistle funnels (shaped like thistle flowers), and dropping funnels have stopcocks which allow the fluids to be added to a flask slowly. For solids, a powder funnel with a short and wide neck/stem is more appropriate as it prevents clogging.

When used with filter paper, filter funnels, Buchner and Hirsch funnels can be used to separate solid particles from a liquid by filtration. To separate very small particles the filter paper in the latter two may be replaced with a sintered glass frit.

Separatory funnels are used in liquid-liquid extractions.

== Manufacturing ==
Borosilicate glass is one of the most common materials of choice for laboratory applications as it is much less reactive than metals or plastics. However, plastic funnels made of non-reactive polyethylene are used for transferring aqueous solutions. Plastic is most often used for powder funnels which do not come into contact with solvents in normal use.

== The types of funnels in the laboratory ==
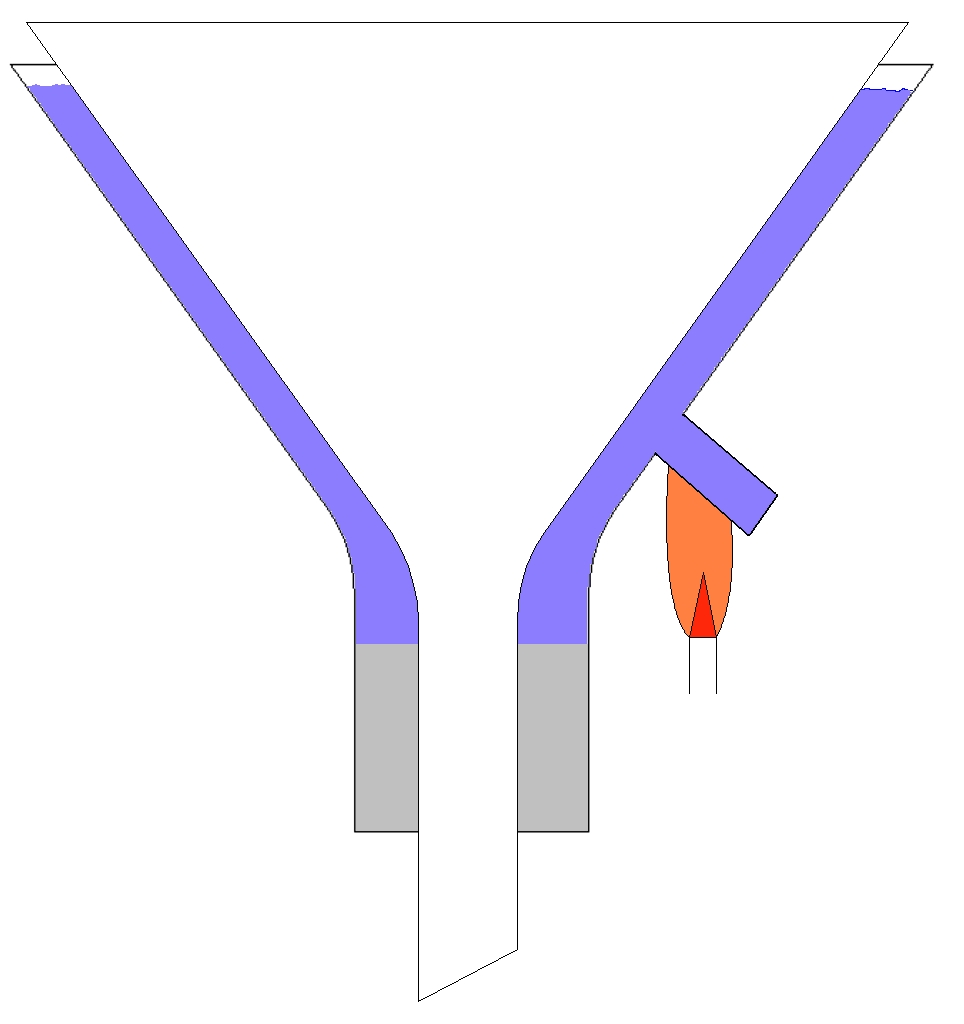
A funnel for hot filtration

Two funnels, A - a simple stemmed funnel. B - a ground glass powder funnel

- Plain funnels are made in various dimensions, with longer or shorter necks.
- Filter funnels have a thin capillary tube neck, and ribs which speed up filtering.
- Powder funnels have a short, wide neck for fast pouring of powders.
- Separatory funnels are pear-shaped, have a cap and a short neck, with a stopcock for the even pouring of fluids. These are used to decant two immiscible fluids. They can be graduated, though this is not very common.
- Hirsch funnels are shaped much like normal funnels, but have holes or sintered glass at the base for quick filtration.
- Dropping funnels are cylindrical, regularly graduated funnels with standard taper ground glass joints. These are often supplied with a pressure equalizer.
- Buchner funnels are made of porcelain and include a plate of sintered glass or perforated porcelain. These are used in filtration under low pressure with a Buchner flask.
- Hot filtration funnel is a less usual funnel which is jacketed and surrounded by a heated fluid.
- Eco funnel is equipped with a latching lid and gasket to reduce chemical contamination and conform to OSHA and EPA regulations.
