= Acid–base extraction =

Separation of chemical species from other acidic or basic compounds

Acid–base extraction is a subclass of liquid–liquid extractions and involves the separation of chemical species from other acidic or basic compounds. It is typically performed during the work-up step following a chemical synthesis to purify crude compounds and results in the product being largely free of acidic or basic impurities. A separatory funnel is commonly used to perform an acid-base extraction.

Acid-base extraction utilizes the difference in solubility of a compound in its acid or base form to induce separation. Typically, the desired compound is changed into its charged acid or base form, causing it to become soluble in aqueous solution and thus be extracted from the non-aqueous (organic) layer. Acid-base extraction is a simple alternative to more complex methods like chromatography. It is not possible to separate chemically similar acids or bases using this simple method.

== Background theory ==
Acid-base extraction works on the fundamental principle that salts are ionic compounds with a high solubility in water, while neutral molecules typically lack solubility in water.

Consider a mixture of acidic and basic compounds dissolved in an organic solvent. Adding aqueous acid will cause the acidic component to stay uncharged, while the basic component will be protonated to form a salt. The uncharged acid component will remain dissolved in the organic solvent, while the highly charged basic salt will migrate to the aqueous solvent. Since the acidic and basic components are now in two different layers, they can easily be separated.

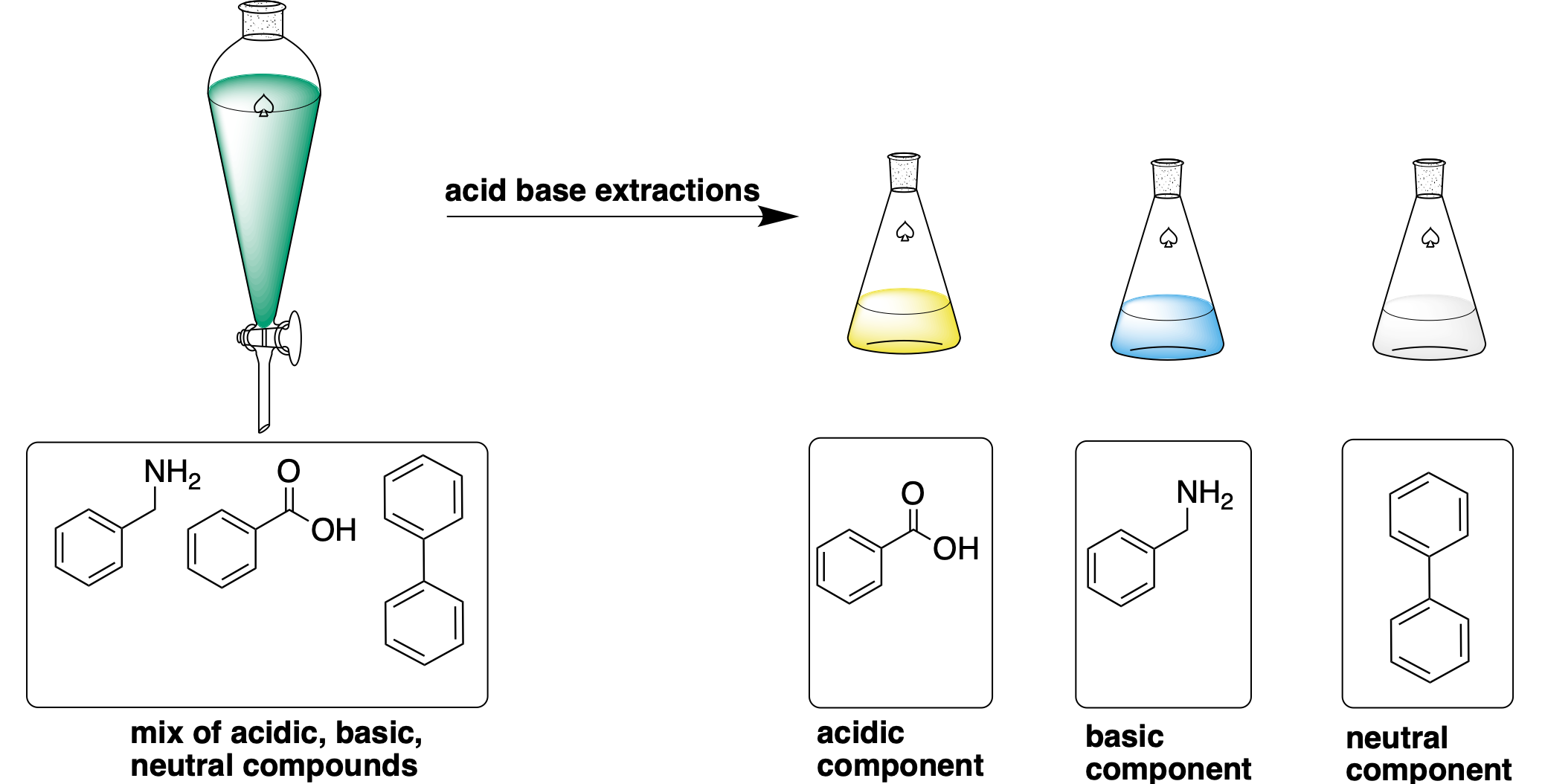
Example of acid base extraction. A 3-component system is separated into its acid component (benzoic acid), base component (benzylamine), and neutral component (biphenyl).

Alternatively, adding aqueous base will cause the acidic component to be deprotonated and form a salt, while the basic component will remain uncharged. In this case, the uncharged base will stay in the organic layer, while the highly charged acidic salt will migrate to the aqueous layer.

If the organic acid component is relatively weak and has a pK_{a} value of ~5 (such as a carboxylic acid), adding additional acid can further improve separation by lowering the pH of the solution. This minimizes the self ionization of the organic acid component and limits its tendency to enter the aqueous layer. This principle is also applicable to an organic base when it is a relatively weak base.

Although acid-base extractions are most commonly used to separate acids from bases, they can be used to separate two acids or two bases from each other. However, the acids and bases must differ greatly in strength, e.g. one strong acid and one very weak acid. Therefore, the two acids must have a pK_{a} (or pK_{b}) difference that is as large as possible. For example, the following can be separated:

- Very weak acids like phenols (pK_{a} around 10) from stronger acids like carboxylic acids (pK_{a} around 4–5).
- Very weak bases (pK_{b} around 13–14) from stronger bases (pK_{b} around 3–4). This is frequently used in purifying soil to determine trace metal concentration.

When separating two acids or two bases, the pH is usually adjusted to a value roughly between the pK_{a} (or pK_{b}) constants. Separation occurs at this intermediate pH because one component is fully ionized, while the other is fully in its neutral form. Often, the solutions used to extract the acids or bases can also be used to control the pH. When separating two acids, the mixture is first washed with a weak base (e.g. sodium bicarbonate) to extract the strong acid, then washed with a strong base (e.g. sodium hydroxide) to extract the weak acid. For separating basic components, weak acid (e.g. dilute acetic acid) is first used to extract the stronger base, then more concentrated acid (e.g. hydrochloric acid or nitric acid) is used to create strongly acidic pH values and separate the weaker base.

== Technique ==
The following procedure is typically followed when performing an acid-base extraction for a mixture containing an acidic and/or basic compound:

1. The mixture of compounds is dissolved in a suitable organic solvent, such as dichloromethane or diethyl ether.
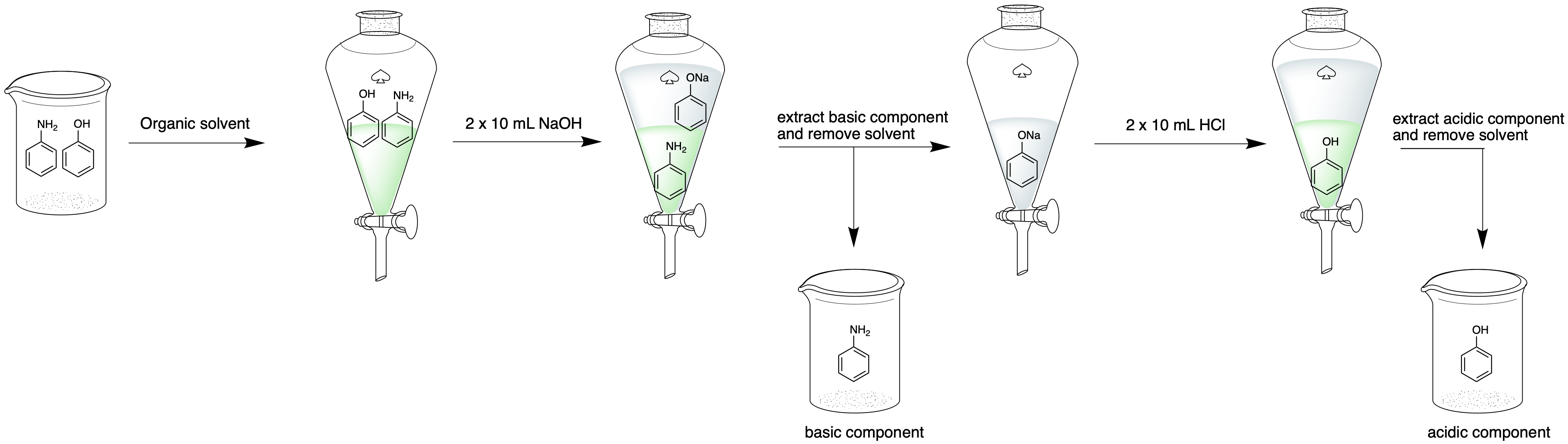
  Example of acid-base extraction of two components: acidic phenol, and basic phenylamine. Phenylamine is first collected in the organic layer, then phenol is collected from the aqueous layer. The green layer in the separatory funnel indicates the organic layer, while the colourless layer indicates the aqueous layer.
2. The solution is added to a separatory funnel. If the desired compound is basic, the solution will be washed with aqueous acid (e.g. 5% HCl); if it is acidic, the solution is washed with aqueous base (e.g. 5% NaOH).
3. The fractions are then shaken and the two phases are separated. The separatory funnel must be vented frequently to alleviate pressure build-up, especially when containing aqueous solutions that evolve carbon dioxide gas upon neutralization (such as sodium bicarbonate).
4. The fraction containing the analyte of interest is then collected. Typically, this is the aqueous layer, as addition of acid or base has caused the analyte to become charged and highly soluble in the aqueous layer. The identity of the aqueous layer depends critically on the organic solvent's density. Organic solvents with a density greater than 1.00 g/mL (e.g. dichloromethane) will sink, causing the aqueous layer to float to the top, while solvents with a density lower than 1.00 g/mL (e.g. ether) will float, causing the aqueous layer to sink to the bottom.
5. The organic fraction is added to the separatory funnel again, and steps 2-4 are repeated twice more to maximize the yield of the extraction. On the final rinse, a brine solution drives any remaining aqueous solution out of the organic layer.
6. If the remaining organic layer contains no analytes of interest, it is discarded; otherwise, the solvent is dried over a suitable drying agent (such as anhydrous sodium sulfate), filtered, then evaporated under reduced pressure to yield the pure compound. If the aqueous layer contains the analyte of interest, it is adjusted to the opposite pH (e.g. basic to acidic). Steps 1-4 are repeated with this fraction using an aqueous solution of opposite pH (e.g. NaOH to HCl). This circular procedure is performed since it is typically much easier to remove organic solvent via rotary evaporation than aqueous solvent.

== Common uses in chemical synthesis ==
Acid-base extraction is frequently used as the first step in a work-up procedure following a chemical synthesis to remove acidic and basic starting materials or impurities. Acid-base extraction is typically a precursor to more complicated purification techniques, such as recrystallization, if the product synthesized is still not completely pure.

Organic synthesis often uses acid-base extractions during work-up procedures. For example, consider a Fischer esterification –– the condensation of a carboxylic acid with an alcohol to form an ester. The post-reaction mixture often consists of small amounts of leftover acid and alcohol, in addition to the desired ester. Acid-base extraction can be used to easily separate out the acidic starting materials from the ester. By rinsing the crude product mixture with a weak base (e.g. sodium bicarbonate), the carboxylic acid and alcohol will be washed away with the aqueous layer, leaving purified ester in the organic layer. The choice of base used for extraction is critical, as a strong base (e.g. sodium hydroxide) will hydrolyze the ester.

Another common example of acid-base extraction occurs following peptide coupling, where the amide product must be separated from leftover carboxylic acid and amine. The carboxylic acid can be removed by rinsing the organic layer with weak base (sodium bicarbonate), while the amine can be removed by rinsing with a weak acid (10% hydrochloric acid). Following these two extractions, the amide will remain in the organic layer and has been significantly purified.

== Troubleshooting ==
The following issues are commonly observed during acid-base extraction and typically have simple solutions

- Only one layer is observed in the separatory funnel.
  - This is due to using an organic solvent with significant miscibility with water (e.g. acetonitrile). The organic solvent used must be water-insoluble to observe phase separation and perform an acid-base extraction.
- Three layers form in the separatory funnel.
  - Often this is a result of insufficient mixing, and light stirring will solve the issue.
- The boundary between the organic layer and aqueous layer is not observed.
  - Ice can be used to identify the boundary as it will float between the two layers.
- An emulsion forms and one layer is suspended in the other as tiny droplets.
  - This can be solved by using a glass stirring rod to gently "push" the tiny droplets into each other, eventually resulting in separation and causing the two layers to appear. Adding a small amount of brine solution can also be used to break up the emulsion; this process is termed "salting out". Emulsions can be prevented by mixing the solutions gently rather than vigorously.
- The relative positions of the aqueous/organic layers are unknown.
  - A small amount of water can be added to the separatory funnel. Whichever layer these droplets go into is identified as the aqueous layer.

== Limitations ==
Acid-base extraction is efficient at separating compounds with a large difference in solubility between their charged and their uncharged form. Therefore, this procedure will not work for:

- Zwitterions with acidic and basic functional groups in the same molecule.
  - For instance, glycine is soluble in water at most pH values and is therefore difficult to be extracted into organic media.
- Lipophilic compounds.
  - Compounds such as tetrabutylammonium salts or fatty acids do not easily dissolve in the aqueous phase in their charged form.
- Basic amines.
  - Amines like ammonia, methylamine, or triethanolamine are miscible or significantly soluble in water at most pH and cannot be extracted into organic media.
- Hydrophilic inorganic acids.
  - Acids like acetic acid are indefinitely miscible in water and have limited solubility in organic solvents.

== Alternatives ==
Alternatives to acid–base extraction include:

- Filtering the mixture through a plug of silica gel or alumina — if the product is a charged salt, it will remain strongly adsorbed to the silica gel or alumina.
- Ion exchange chromatography can separate acids, bases, or mixtures of strong and weak acids and bases by their varying affinities to the column medium at different pH.
- Using column chromatography to separate the neutral compounds according to their ratio-of-fronts values.
- Gel electrophoresis, which separates large biomolecules based on their charge and size.

== See also ==
- Chromatography
- Extraction
- Multiphasic liquid
- Separating funnel
