= Funnel (disambiguation) =

A funnel is a pipe with a wide mouth, good for feeding, often conical mouth and a narrow stem.

Funnel may also refer to:

- Funnel (ship)
  - Chimney (locomotive), sometimes known as a funnel
- Funnel (concurrent computing)
- Funnel (software), a Swedish software company
- Purchase funnel (sales and marketing)
- Conversion funnel (web analytics)
- Funnels, fictional drone units in the fictional Universal Century timeline of the Gundam Franchise.

== See also ==
- Funneling (disambiguation)
- Funnel cake, a fried batter desert
- Funnel chart
- Funnel cloud
