= Extraction (chemistry) =

Separation of a desired substance from other substances in the sample

Schematic of a separatory funnel showing two immiscible liquids, where 1 is any phase less dense than 2. Phase 1 is typically an organic solvent and 2 an aqueous phase.

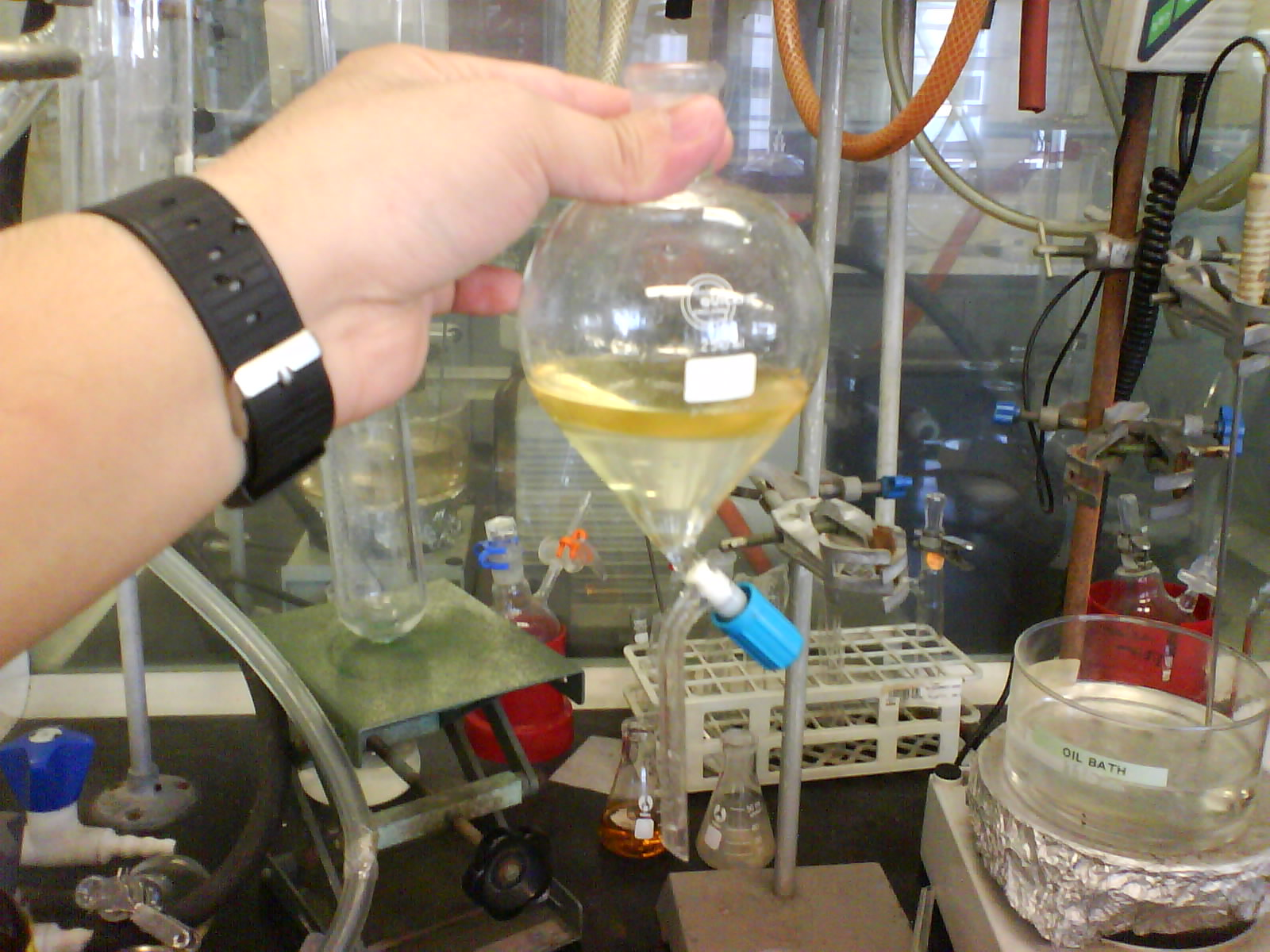
Laboratory-scale liquid-liquid extraction. Photograph of a separatory funnel in a laboratory scale extraction of 2 immiscible liquids: liquids are a diethyl ether upper phase, and a lower aqueous phase.

Schematic representation of a Soxhlet extractor: 1. Stirrer bar; 2. Still pot (the still pot should not be overfilled and the volume of solvent in the still pot should be 3 to 4 times the volume of the Soxhlet chamber); 3. Distillation path; 4. Thimble; 5. Solid; 6. Siphon top; 7. Siphon exit; 8. Expansion adapter; 9. Condenser; 10. Cooling water out; 11. Cooling water in

Extraction in chemistry is a separation process consisting of the separation of a substance from a matrix. The distribution of a solute between two phases is an equilibrium condition described by partition theory. This is based on exactly how the analyte moves from the initial solvent into the extracting solvent. The term washing may also be used to refer to an extraction in which impurities are extracted from the solvent containing the desired compound.

== Types of extraction ==
- Liquid–liquid extraction
  - Acid-base extraction
  - Supercritical fluid extraction
- Solid-liquid extraction
  - Solid-phase extraction
  - Maceration (grinding)
  - Ultrasound-assisted extraction
  - Microwave-assisted extraction
  - Heat reflux extraction
  - Instant controlled pressure drop extraction (Détente instantanée contrôlée)
  - Supercritical fluid extraction
  - Pressurized liquid extraction
- Perstraction

== Laboratory applications and examples ==
Liquid-liquid extractions in the laboratory usually make use of a separatory funnel, where two immiscible phases are combined to separate a solute from one phase into the other, according to the relative solubility in each of the phases. Typically, this will be to extract organic compounds out of an aqueous phase and into an organic phase, but may also include extracting water-soluble impurities from an organic phase into an aqueous phase.

Common extractants may be arranged in increasing order of polarity according to the Hildebrand solubility parameter:

ethyl acetate < acetone < ethanol < methanol < acetone:water (7:3) < ethanol:water (8:2) < methanol:water (8:2) < water

Solid-liquid extractions at laboratory scales can use Soxhlet extractors. A solid sample containing the desired compound along with impurities is placed in the thimble. An extracting solvent is chosen in which the impurities are insoluble and the desired compound has at least limited solubility. The solvent is refluxed and condensed solvent falls into the thimble and dissolves the desired compound which then passes back through the filter into the flask. After extraction is complete the solvent can be removed and the desired product collected.

== Everyday applications and examples ==
Boiling tea leaves in water extracts the tannins, theobromine, and caffeine out of the leaves and into the water, as an example of a solid-liquid extraction. A microwave-assisted approach is common among Americans.

Brewing of coffee can make use of many more advanced solid-liquid extraction techniques, especially pressurized fluid (espresso machine) and heat reflux (coffee percolator).

Chefs commonly use oil, both cold and hot, to extract aroma-bearing compounds from herbs and spices.

Decaffeination of tea and coffee is also an example of an extraction, where the caffeine molecules are removed from the tea leaves or coffee beans, often utilising supercritical fluid extraction with CO_{2} or standard solid-liquid extraction techniques.

== See also ==
- Sample preparation (analytical chemistry)
- Solvent
- Solvent impregnated resins
- Thin Layer Extraction
- Leaching (Chemistry)
