= Work-up =

Procedures for isolating and purifying products of a chemical reaction

In chemistry, work-up refers to the series of manipulations required to isolate and purify the product(s) of a chemical reaction. The term is used colloquially to refer to these manipulations, which may include:

- deactivating any unreacted reagents by quenching a reaction.
- cooling the reaction mixture or adding an antisolvent to induce precipitation, and collecting or removing the solids by filtration, decantation, or centrifugation.
- changing the protonation state of the products or impurities by adding an acid or base.
- separating the reaction mixture into organic and aqueous layers by liquid-liquid extraction.
- removal of solvents by evaporation.
- purification by chromatography, distillation or recrystallization.

The work-up steps required for a given chemical reaction may require one or more of these manipulations. Work-up steps are not always explicitly shown in reaction schemes. Written experimental procedures will describe work-up steps but will usually not formally refer to them as a work-up.

== Examples ==
=== Isolation of benzoic acid ===
The Grignard reaction between phenylmagnesium bromide (1) and carbon dioxide in the form of dry ice gives the conjugate base of benzoic acid (2). The desired product, benzoic acid (3), is obtained by the following work-up:

Synthesis of benzoic acid with work-up step in red.

- The reaction mixture containing the Grignard reagent is allowed to warm to room temperature in a water bath to allow excess dry ice to evaporate.
- Any remaining Grignard reagent is quenched by the addition of water.
- Dilute hydrochloric acid is added to the reaction mixture to protonate the benzoate salts, as well as to dissolve the magnesium salts. White solids of impure benzoic acid are obtained.
- The benzoic acid is decanted to remove the aqueous solution of impurities, more water is added, and the mixture is brought to a boil with more water added to give a homogeneous solution.
- The solution is allowed to cool slowly to room temperature, then in an ice bath to recrystallize benzoic acid.
- The recrystallized benzoic acid crystals are collected on a Buchner funnel and are allowed to air-dry to give pure benzoic acid.

=== Dehydration of 4-methylcyclohexanol ===
This dehydration reaction produces the desired alkene (3) from an alcohol (1). The reaction is performed in a distillation apparatus so the formed alkene product can be distilled off and collected as the reaction proceeds. The water produced by the reaction as well as some acid will co-distill, giving a distillate mixture (2). The product is isolated from the mixture by the following work-up:

Synthesis of 4-methylcyclohexene with work-up step in red.

- A concentrated solution of sodium chloride in water, known as a brine solution, is added to the mixture and the layers are allowed to separate. The brine is used to remove any acid or water from the organic layer. In this example the organic layer is the product, which is a liquid at room temperature.
- The bottom aqueous layer is removed with a pipette and discarded.
- The top layer is transferred to an Erlenmeyer flask where it is treated with anhydrous sodium sulfate to remove any remaining water.
- The sodium sulfate is filtered out leaving the pure liquid product.

=== Synthesis of an amide ===
The reaction between a secondary amine (1) and an acyl chloride (2) yields the desired amide (4) as shown below. The acyl chloride is added slowly to a solution of the amine and triethylamine in dichloromethane at 0 °C. The reaction is allowed to warm to room temperature and is stirred for 14 hours. The following manipulations are then performed on the crude reaction mixture (3) to isolate the desired product:

Synthesis of an amide with work-up step in red.

- A concentrated solution of sodium bicarbonate is added to the reaction mixture. This will promote the migration of impurities and byproducts to the aqueous layer and leave the product in the dichloromethane (organic layer). The aqueous and organic layers are allowed to separate. This process is typically performed in a separatory funnel.
- The aqueous layer is collected and extracted once with dichloromethane.
- The organic phase is collected and dried with anhydrous sodium sulfate.
- The solid is filtered off and the organic layer is concentrated under reduced pressure to yield the desired amide.
- Further purification is achieved by flash column chromatography.
