= Killing cone =

Funnel used in the slaughter of poultry

A killing cone, also known as a restraining cone or poultry cone, is a funnel used in the slaughter of poultry. The cone is used to hold a to-be slaughtered bird upside down, thus allowing for the animal to be bled more easily.

== Description ==
Killing cones are used to facilitate the slaughter of poultry, normally chicken, ducks, or geese. Such cones come in a number of sizes to accommodate different-sized birds. The cone functions by holding a bird in place - a captive bird can be placed head first into the funnel so that the animal's head hangs down through the small part of the funnel. The animal can then be bled (normally via an incision in the throat) more easily while the funnel contains any wing motions and facilitates the draining of blood. According to some sources, killing cones have the added benefit of inducing a sense of disorientation, relaxation, and euphoria in a captive bird as some birds exhibit tonic immobility when held upside down. Some killing cones have a clamp device attached to dislocate the neck of the bird before bleeding.

Due to their low cost and ease of manufacture, killing cones are often used by farmers who lack access to more complex equipment.
