= Funneling =

Funneling may refer to:

- Using a funnel (a pipe with a wide, often conical mouth and a narrow stem)
- Funneling, the process of using a beer bong
- Funneling at the internal orifice of the uterus

== See also ==
- Funnel (disambiguation)
