= Funnel =

Pipe with a wide top and narrow bottom

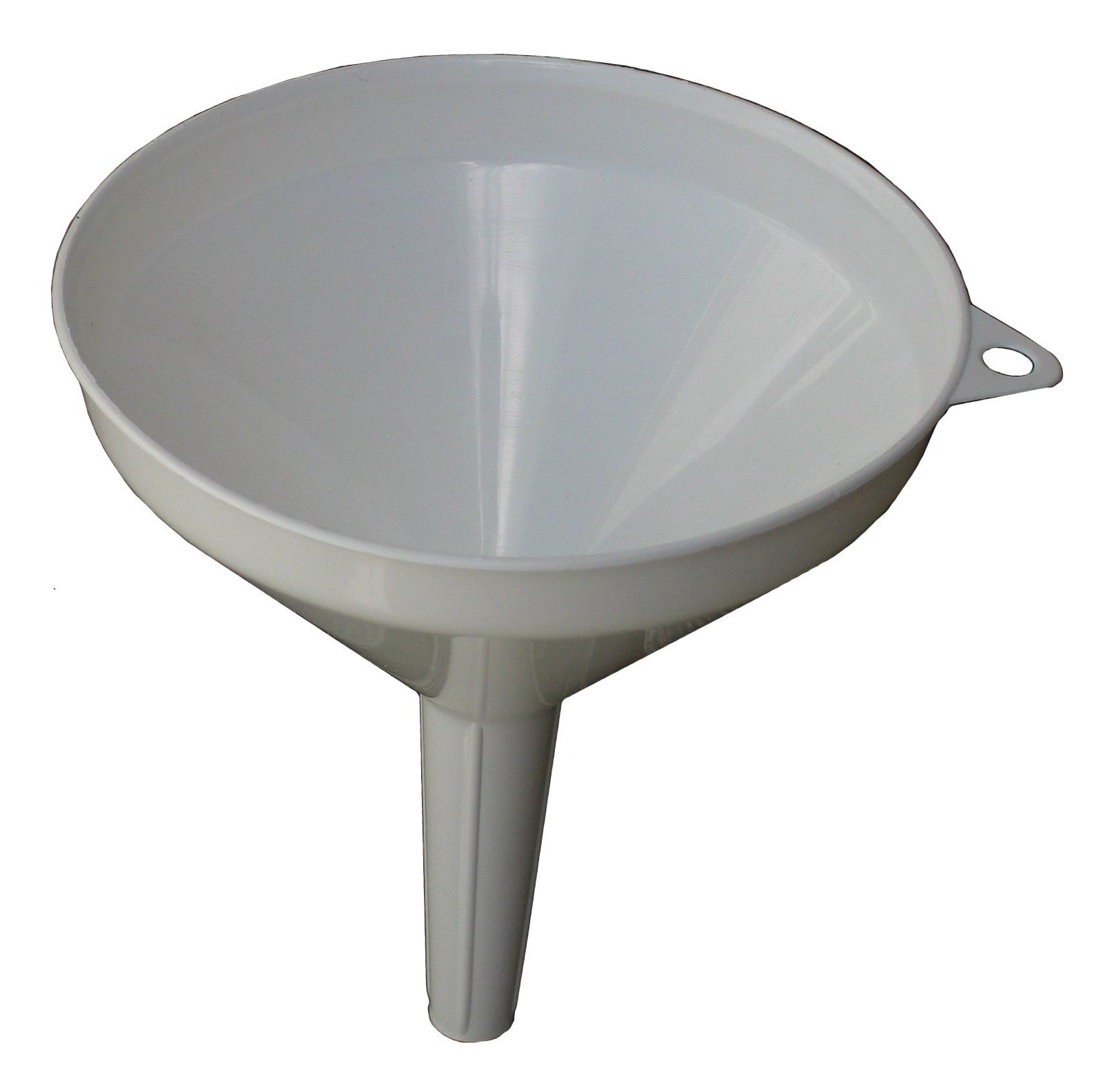
A typical kitchen funnel

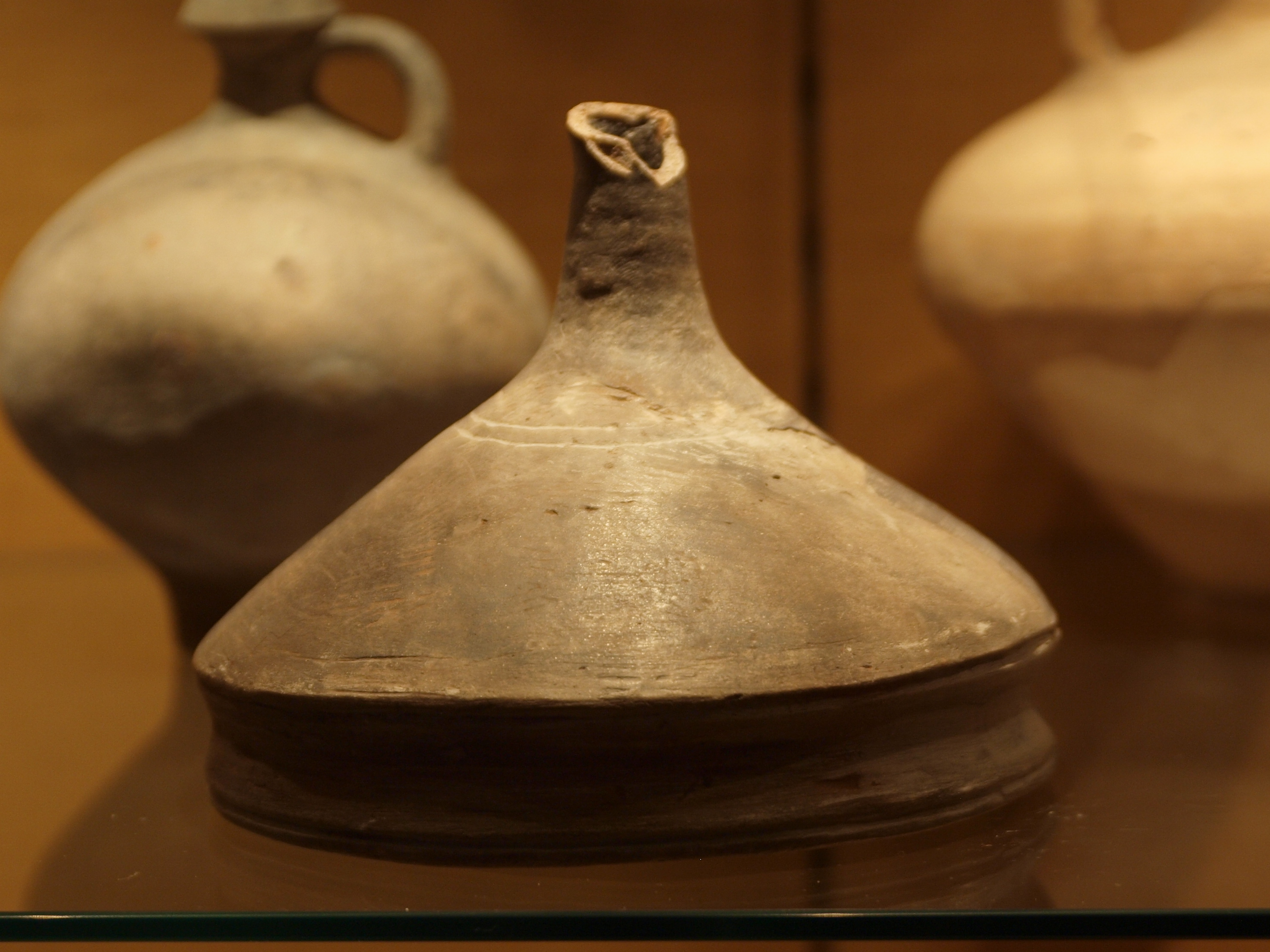
A ceramic Roman kitchen funnel (1st–3rd century AD)

A funnel is a tube or pipe that is wide at the top and narrow at the bottom, used for guiding liquid or powder into a small opening.

Funnels are usually made of stainless steel, aluminium, glass, or plastic. The material used in its construction should be sturdy enough to withstand the weight of the substance being transferred, and it should not react with the substance. For this reason, stainless steel or glass are useful in transferring diesel fuel, while plastic funnels are useful in the kitchen. Sometimes disposable paper funnels are used in cases where it would be difficult to adequately clean the funnel afterwards (for example, in adding motor oil into a car). Dropper funnels, also called dropping funnels or tap funnels, have a tap to allow the controlled release of a liquid. A flat funnel, made of polypropylene, utilises living hinges and flexible walls to fold flat.

The term "funnel" may refer to the chimney or smokestack on a steam locomotive and commonly refers to the same on a ship. The term funnel is also applied to other seemingly strange objects like a smoking pipe or a kitchen bin.

== Laboratory funnels ==
There are many different kinds of funnels that have been adapted for specialised applications in the laboratory, such as filter funnels and thistle funnels (shaped like thistle flowers). Dropping funnels have stopcocks which allow the fluids to be added to a flask slowly. For solids, a powder funnel with a wide and short stem is more appropriate as it does not clog easily.

When used with filter paper, filter funnels, Büchner and Hirsch funnels can be used to remove fine particles from a liquid in a process called filtration. For more demanding applications, the filter paper in the latter two may be replaced with a sintered glass frit. Separatory funnels are used in liquid-liquid extractions. The Tullgren funnel is used to collect arthropods from plant litter or similar material.

=== Construction ===
Glass is the material of choice for laboratory applications due to its inertness compared with metals or plastics. However, plastic funnels made of nonreactive polyethylene are used for transferring aqueous solutions. Plastic is most often used for powder funnels that do not come into contact with solvent in normal use.

=== Uses ===
- To channel liquids or fine-grained substances into containers with a small opening. Used for pouring liquids or powder through a small opening and for holding the filter paper in filtration. Used in transferring liquids in small containers.
- Funnels known as killing cones are used to slaughter individual birds in poultry farming. The funnel is used to hold a bird upside down so that it can be bled more easily.

== See also ==
- Funneling (disambiguation)
- Tundish, used in plumbing and continuous casting
