= Decantation =

Process for the separation of mixtures

Decanting a liquid from a solid

Decantation is a process for the separation of mixtures of immiscible liquids or of a liquid and a solid mixture such as a suspension. The layer closer to the top of the container—the less dense of the two liquids, or the liquid from which the precipitate or sediment has settled out—is poured off, leaving denser liquid or the solid behind. The process typically is unable to remove all of the top layer, meaning the separation is incomplete or at least one of the two separated components is still contaminated by the other one.

== Processes ==
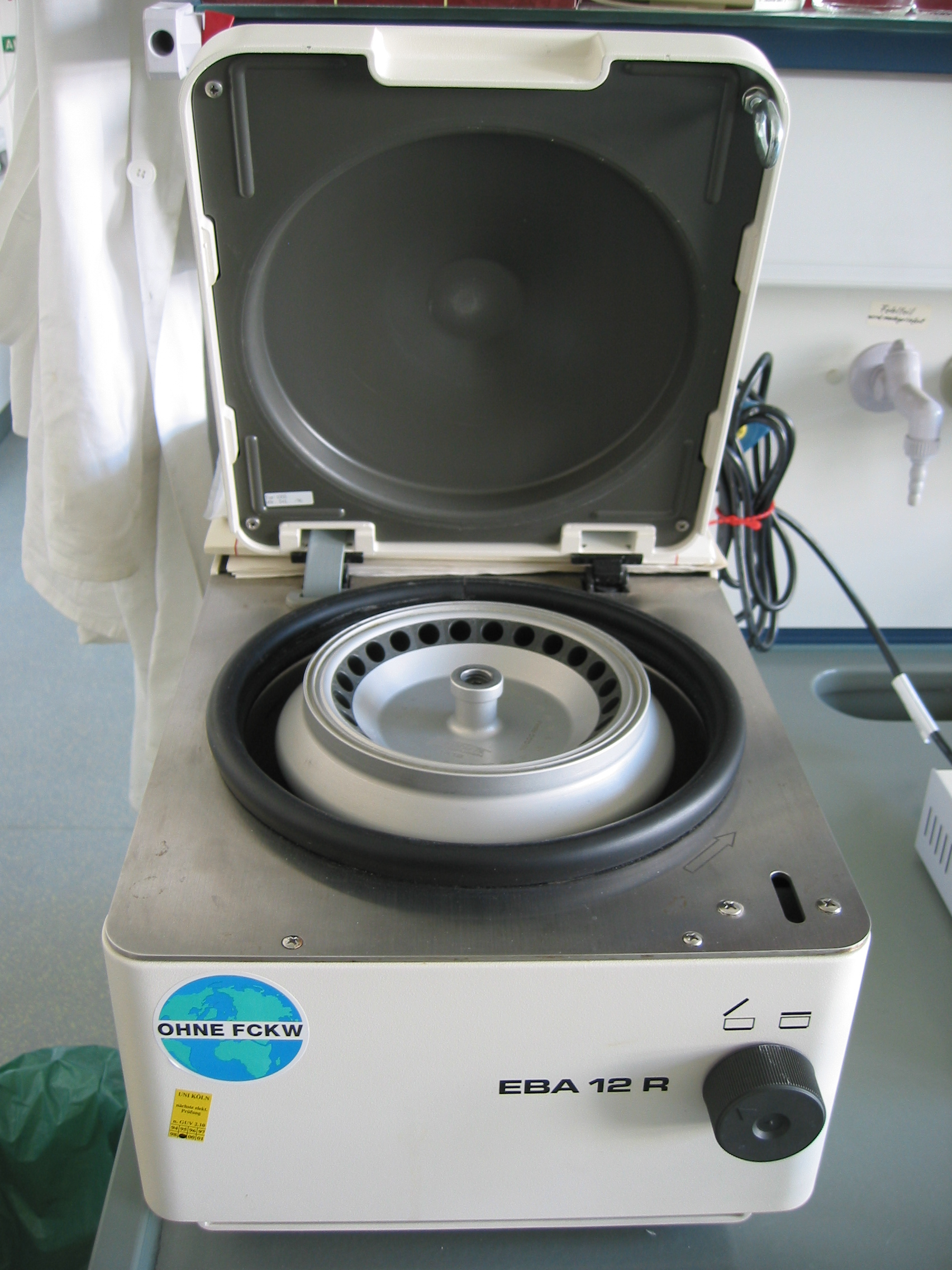
A centrifuge

=== Immiscible liquid separation ===
Decantation can be used to separate immiscible liquids that have different densities. For example, when a mixture of water and oil is present in a beaker, after some time a distinct layer between the two liquids is formed, with the oil layer floating on top of the water layer. This separation can be done by pouring oil out of the container, leaving water behind. Generally, this technique gives an incomplete separation as it is difficult to pour off all of the top layer without pouring out some parts of the bottom layer.

A separatory funnel is an alternative apparatus for separating liquid layers. It has a valve at the bottom to allow draining off the bottom layer. It can give better separation between the two liquids.

=== Liquid-solid separation ===
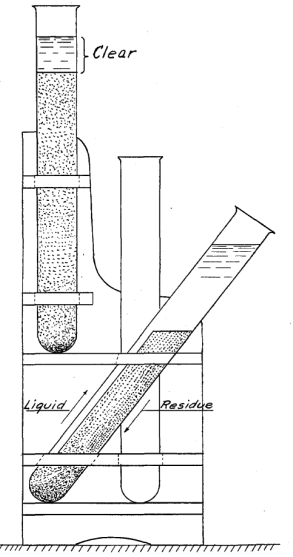
Illustration from a 1918 article telling why solids settle faster in a slanted tube

Decantation can also separate solid and liquid mixtures by allowing gravity to pull the solid fragments to settle at the bottom of the container. In laboratory situations, decantation of mixtures containing solids and liquids occur in test tubes. To enhance productivity, test tubes should be placed at a 45° angle to allow sediments to settle at the bottom of the apparatus.

A centrifuge machine may also be used in decantation as the natural process of settling down is time-consuming and tedious. A centrifuge forces the precipitate to the bottom of the container; if the force is high enough, solids can aggregate to form pellets, making it easier to separate the mixtures. Then the liquid can be more easily poured away, as the precipitate will tend to remain in its compressed form.

A decanter centrifuge may be used for continuous solid-liquid separation.

== Examples ==
Decantation of wine

Decantation is frequently used to purify a liquid by separating it from a suspension of insoluble particles (e.g. in red wine, where the wine is decanted from the potassium bitartrate crystals to avoid unsavory taste). This makes the wine more tonic and astringent.

Cream accelerates to the top of milk, allowing the separation of milk and cream. This is used in the cheese industry. Fat is determined in butter by decantation.

To obtain a sample of clear water from muddy water, muddy water is poured into another container, which separates the water from the mud.

In the sugar industry, the processing of sugar beets into granular sugar involves many liquid–solid separations; e.g. separation of syrups from crystals.

Decantation is also present in nanotechnology. In the synthesis of high quality silver nanowire (AgNW) solutions and fabrication process of high performance electrodes, decantation is also being applied which greatly simplifies the purification process.

After using a desiccant to absorb water from an organic liquid, the organic liquid can often be decanted away from the desiccant.

The process of deriving vinegar also requires decantation to remove fats and biomolecular antioxidants from the raw substance.

Plasma can be separated from blood through decantation by using a centrifuge.

Mercury is disposed of in water bodies during mining, turning the water unfit and toxic. The mercury can be removed through decantation.

== See also ==
- Sedimentation
- Centrifugation
