= Funnel (software) =

Swedish software company founded in 2014

- Company type: Private
- Industry: Marketing; Software
- Founded: 2014 in Stockholm, Sweden
- Founders: Fredrik Skantze; Per Made
- Headquarters: Stockholm, Sweden
- Revenue: $50 million (2023)
- Number of employees: 335 (2022)
- Website: https://funnel.io/

Funnel is a Swedish software company headquartered in Stockholm, Sweden.

Founded in 2014 by Fredrik Skantze and Per Made, Funnel specializes in marketing data software that enables businesses to collect, prepare, and analyze data from various platforms. As of 2025, the company has expanded internationally, with additional offices in Dublin, Sydney, and Boston, Massachusetts.

== Products ==
Funnel describes its product as a marketing intelligence platform comprising three core components: data integration, marketing reporting, and advanced measurement. The platform is designed to help organizations collect, transform, and analyze marketing data from multiple sources. In 2024, Funnel expanded its product suite to include tools for advanced marketing measurement, such as marketing mix modeling (MMM) and digital attribution.

== History ==
Funnel was founded in 2014 by Per Made and Fredrik Skantze, who had previously developed an advertising tool for Facebook called Qwaya. In 2016, the company opened a second office in Boston, Massachusetts.

In 2017, Funnel raised €8.3 million (approximately $10 million) in a funding round led by Balderton Capital. As part of the investment, Suranga Chandratillake of Balderton Capital joined the company's board of directors.

In January 2020, Funnel raised €42.6 million (approximately $47 million) in a Series B funding round. In October 2021, the company announced a pre-IPO funding round worth €57.1 million (approximately $66 million).

In June 2020, Funnel won TechCrunch’s Europas Award for Best Marketing Tech Startup.

Financial Times included Funnel in its annual FT 1000 list of Europe's fastest-growing companies for four consecutive years—2021, 2022, 2023, and 2024.

In 2023, Funnel was named one of the "Top 100 Next Unicorns" by VivaTech and GP Bullhound.

=== Partnerships ===
Funnel collaborates with media and marketing agencies such as IndieAd and Havas. The company also partners with several technology providers to facilitate the integration and exchange of data between platforms, including Google Cloud.
