= Thistle tube =

Also called a thistle funnel

A thistle tube is a piece of laboratory glassware consisting of a shaft of tube, with a reservoir and funnel-like section at the top. Thistle tubes are typically used by chemists to add liquid to an existing system or apparatus. Thistle funnels are used to add small volumes of liquids to an exact position. Thistle funnels are found with or without taps.

The thistle tube shaft is designed to allow insertion through a small hole present in some stoppers, permitting the tube to be inserted into a container such as an Erlenmeyer flask.
