= Filter funnel =

Laboratory funnel used for separating solids from liquids

A filter funnel is a laboratory funnel used for separating solids from liquids via the laboratory process of filtering.

In order to achieve this, a cone-like shaped piece of filter paper is usually folded into a cone and placed within the funnel. The suspension of solid and liquid is then poured through the funnel. The solid particles are too large to pass through the filter paper and are left on the paper, while the much smaller liquid molecules pass through the paper to a vessel positioned below the funnel, producing a filtrate. The filter paper is used only once. The filtered liquid, the removed solid residue, or both may be of interest and kept.

If the filter paper has small pores, long-chained non polar liquids such as oil may clog it.

Cruder funnels than laboratory versions, made of polyethylene or galvanized steel and using a reusable brass or plastic mesh filter screen rather than paper, are typically used for automotive and similar workshop use, for example to filter debris from fuel, lubricating oil and coolant. The screen is reusable, and may be cleaned by inverting the funnel and tapping it on a hard surface, or popping it out and washing it separately. Use of a funnel helps to avoid liquid spills.
