= Dropping funnel =

Laboratory glassware used to transfer fluids slowly

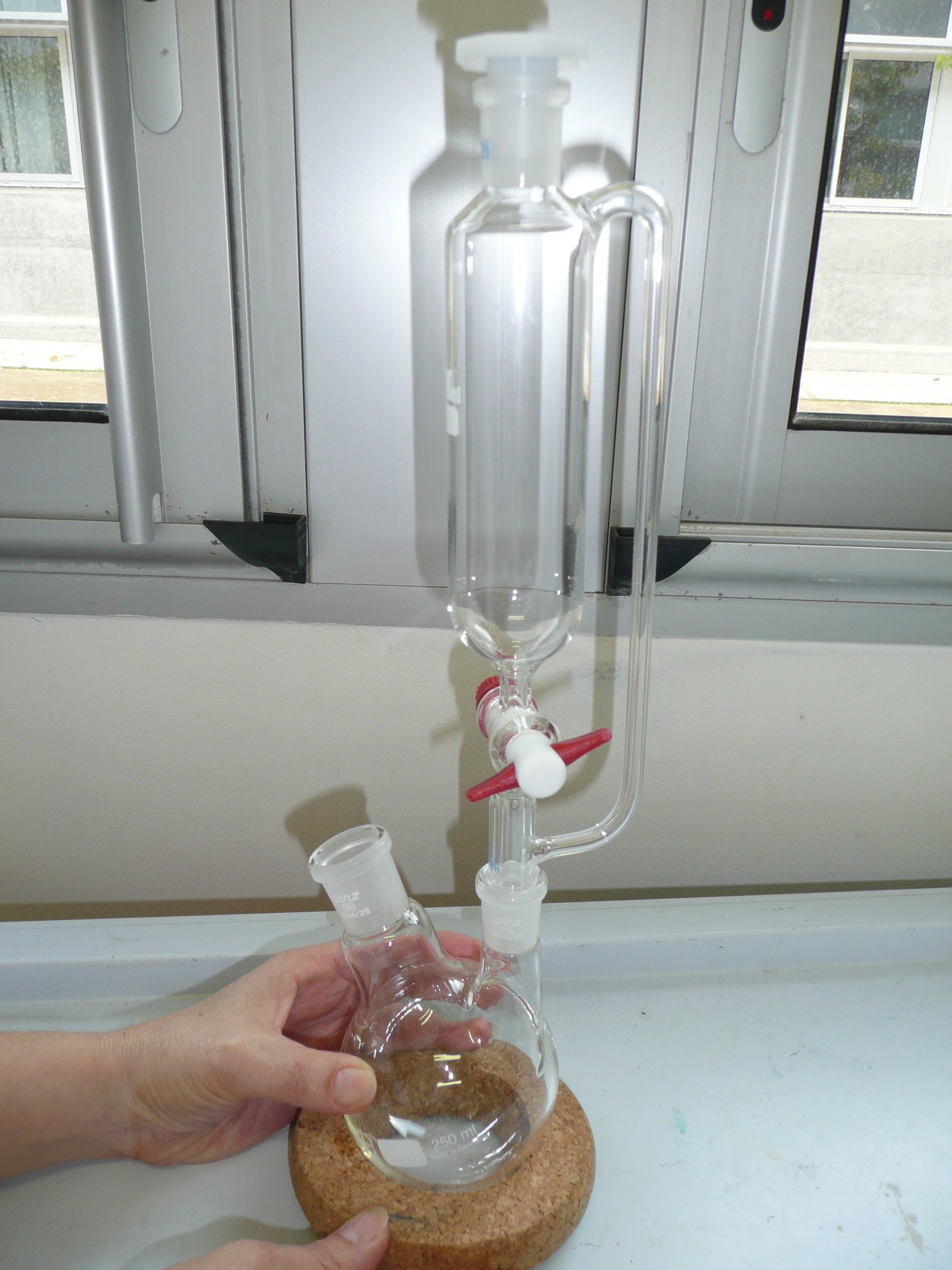
Note the stopcock, glass tube at the right, and ground glass joint in this pressure-equalizing dropping funnel. An ordinary dropping funnel lacks the pressure-equalizing glass tube at the right side.

A dropping funnel or addition funnel is a type of laboratory glassware used to transfer liquids. It is fitted with a stopcock which allows the flow to be controlled. Dropping funnels are useful for adding reagents slowly, i.e. drop-wise. This is desirable when the quick addition of the reagent results in side reactions, or if the reaction is too vigorous.

Dropping funnels are usually constructed with a ground glass joint at the bottom, which allows the funnel to fit snugly onto a round bottom flask. This also means it need not be clamped separately.

Dropping funnels have been in use since at least the mid-1800s.

== Types ==
- cylindrical type graduated and ungraduated with cone and socket
- with pressure equalizing tube
- pear shaped, graduated and ungraduated

Pressure-equalizing dropping funnels have an additional narrow-bore glass tube from the bulb of the funnel, to the ground glass joint around the stem. These replace the liquid volume lost in the bulb with the equivalent gas volume from the flask into which the reagent is flowing, and are useful when handling air-sensitive reagents in a sealed, inert-gas environment. Without this tube, or some other means to equalize the pressure between a sealed receiving flask and the bulb of the funnel, the flow of fluid from the bulb will rapidly come to a halt.

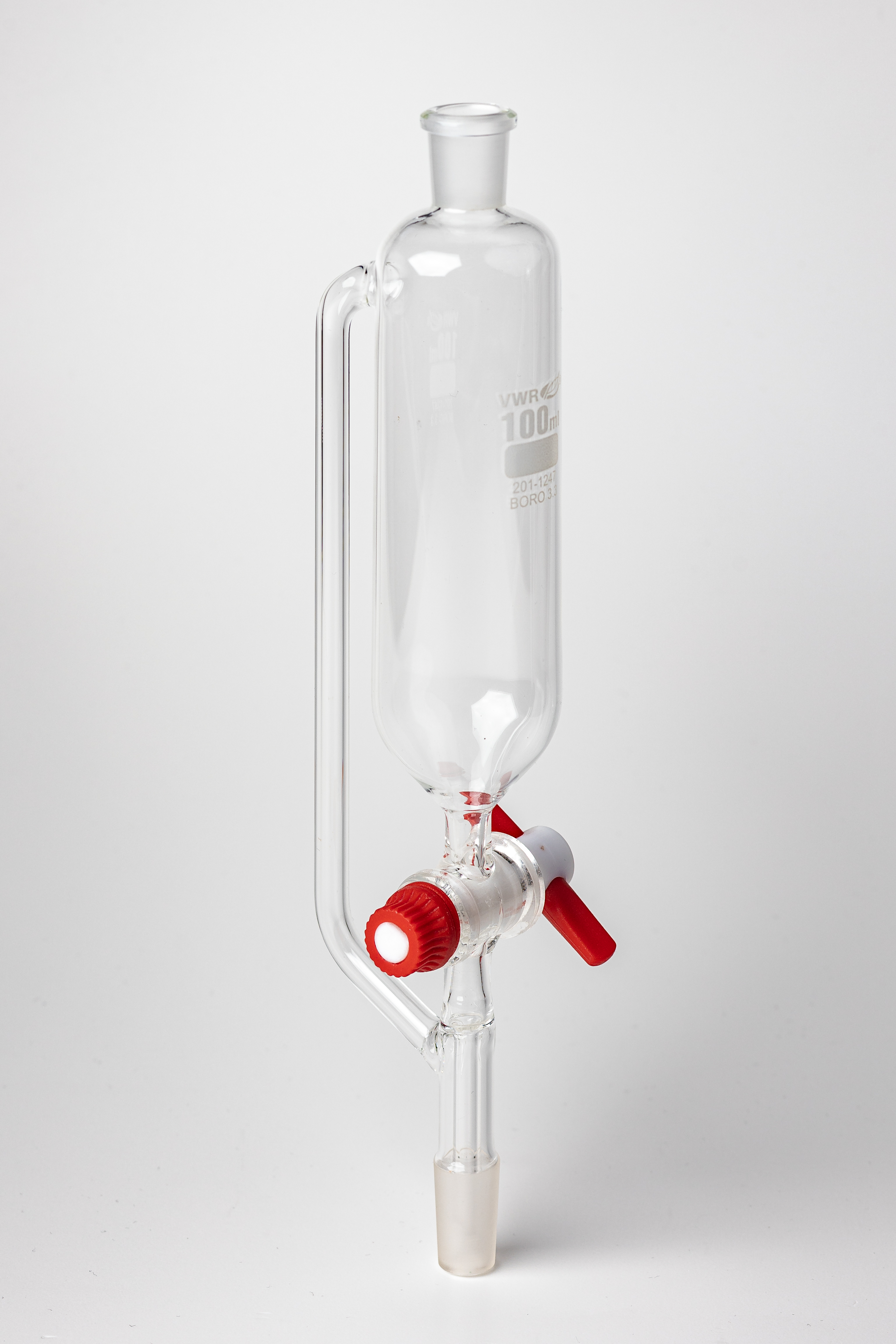

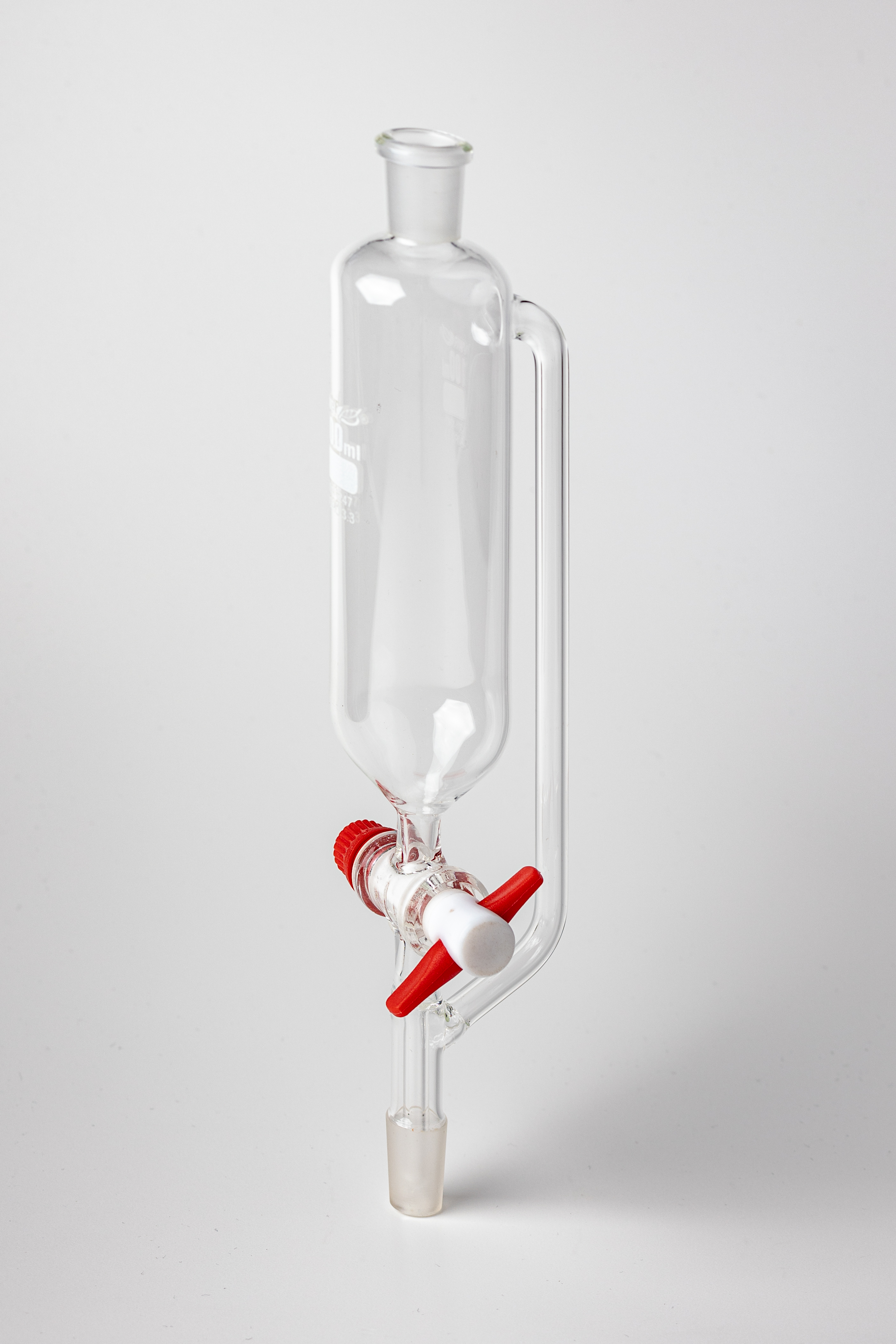

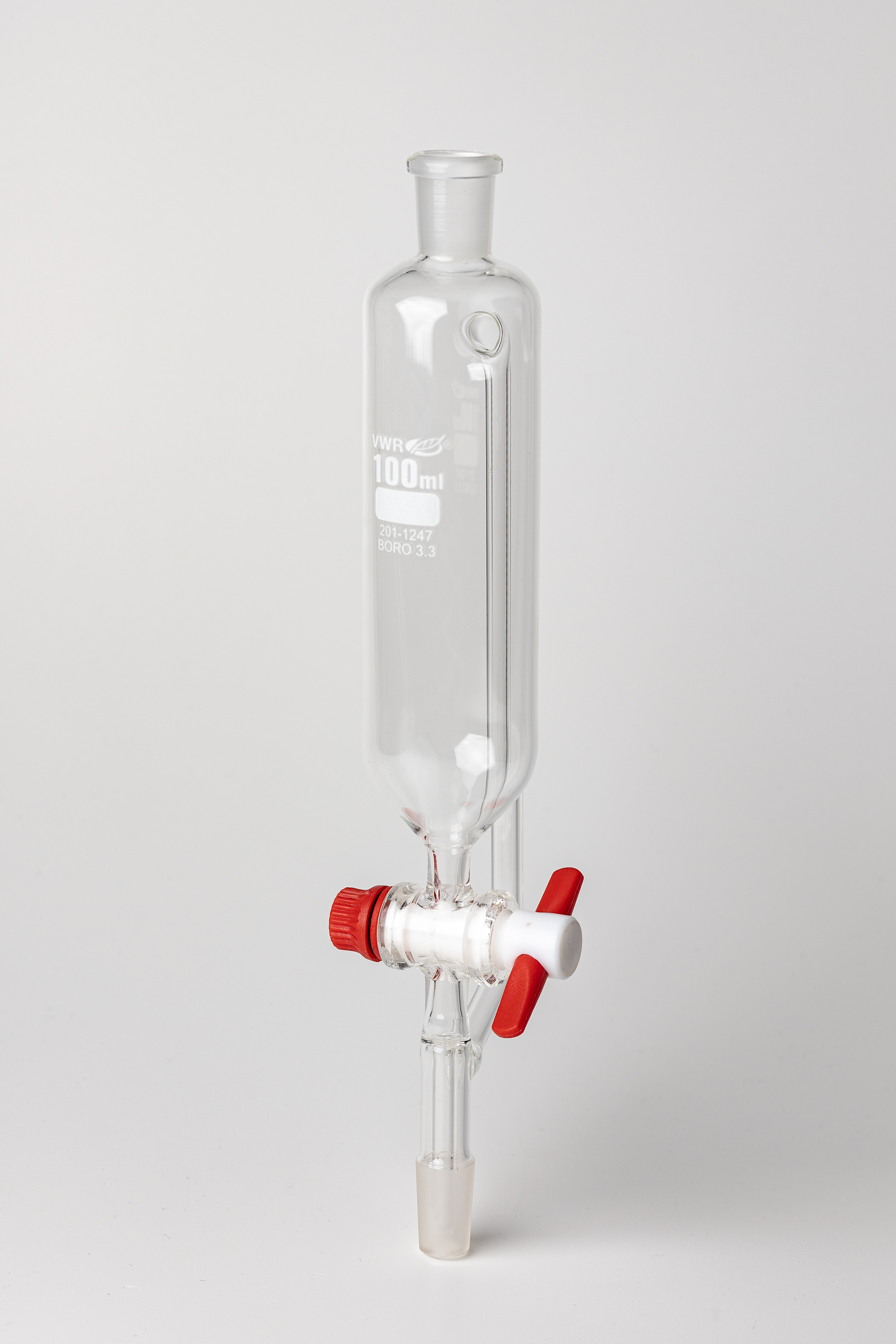

== See also ==
- Separatory funnels are similar in shape and design, and may be used as dropping funnels. They do not always have the ground glass joint at the stem, instead having a narrow tube suitable for insertion into a rubber stopper.
