= Separatory funnel =

Laboratory glassware

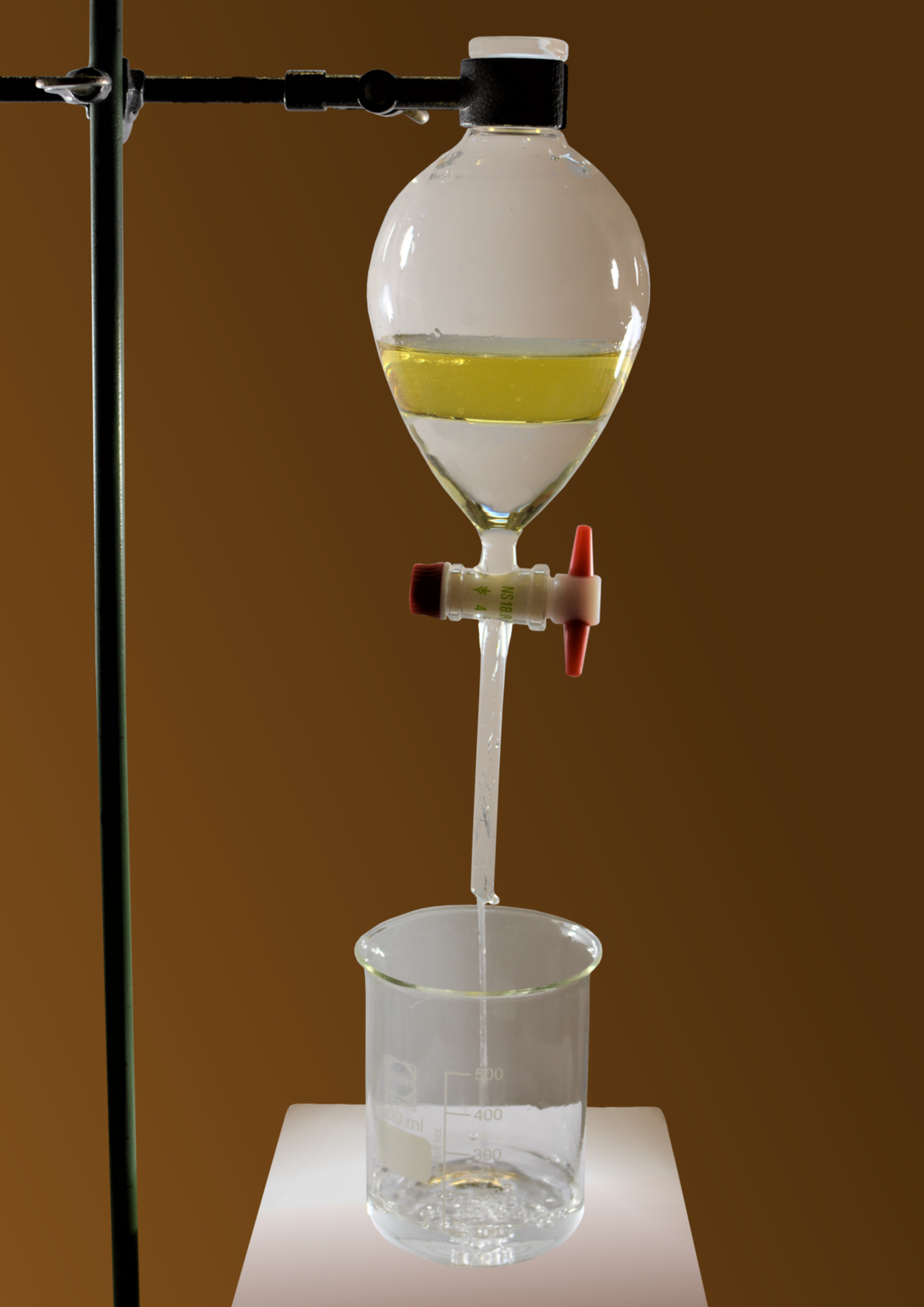
Separating funnel in use. The organic phase (yellow, upper phase) has a lower density than the aqueous phase (lower phase). The aqueous phase is being drained into the beaker.

A separatory funnel, also known as a separation funnel, separating funnel, or colloquially sep funnel, is a piece of laboratory glassware used in liquid-liquid extractions to separate (partition) the components of a mixture into two immiscible solvent phases of different densities. Typically, one of the phases will be aqueous, and the other a lipophilic organic solvent such as ether, MTBE, dichloromethane, chloroform, or ethyl acetate. All of these solvents form a clear delineation between the two liquids. The more dense liquid, typically the aqueous phase unless the organic phase is halogenated, sinks to the bottom of the funnel and can be drained out through a valve away from the less dense liquid, which remains in the separatory funnel.

== Description ==
Two funnels: A - Cone, or Pear-shaped, B - cylindrical.

A separating funnel takes the shape of a cone with a hemispherical end. It has a stopper at the top and stopcock (tap), at the bottom. Separating funnels used in laboratories are typically made from borosilicate glass and their taps are made from glass or PTFE. Typical sizes are between 30 mL and 3 L. In industrial chemistry they can be much larger and for much larger volumes centrifuges are used. The sloping sides are designed to facilitate the identification of the layers. The tap-controlled outlet is designed to drain the liquid out of the funnel. On top of the funnel there is a standard taper joint which fits with a ground glass or Teflon stopper.

To use a separating funnel, the two phases and the mixture to be separated in solution are added through the top with the stopcock at the bottom closed. The funnel is then closed and shaken gently by inverting the funnel multiple times; if the two solutions are mixed together too vigorously, a third phase (an emulsion) will form. The funnel is then inverted and the stopcock carefully opened to release excess vapor pressure. The separating funnel is set aside to allow for the complete separation of the phases. The top and the bottom stopcock are then opened and the lower phase is released by gravitation. The top must be opened while releasing the lower phase to allow pressure equalization between the inside of the funnel and the atmosphere. When the bottom layer has been removed, the stopcock is closed and the upper layer is poured out through the top into another container.

== Theory ==
The separating funnel relies on the concept of "like dissolves like", which describes the ability of polar solvents to dissolve polar solutes and non-polar solvents to dissolve non-polar solutes. When the separating funnel is agitated, each solute migrates to the solvent (also referred to as "phase") in which it is more soluble.

The solvents normally do not form a unified solution together because they are immiscible. When the funnel is kept stationary after agitation, the liquids form distinct physical layers - lower density liquids will stay above higher density liquids. A mixture of solutes is thus separated into two physically separate solutions, each enriched in different solutes.

The stopcock may be opened after the two phases separate to allow the bottom layer to escape the separator funnel. The top layer may be retained in the separating funnel for further extractions with additional batches of solvent or drained out into a separate vessel for other uses. If it is desired to retain the bottom layer in the separating funnel for further extractions, both layers are taken out separately, and then the former bottom layer is returned to the separating funnel.

Each independent solution can then be extracted again with additional batches of solvent, used for other physical or chemical processes. If the goal was to separate a soluble material from mixture, the solution containing that desired product can sometimes simply be evaporated to leave behind the purified solute. For this reason, it is a practical benefit to use volatile solvents for extracting the desired material from the mixture.

== Emulsions ==
One of the drawbacks of using a separating funnel is emulsions can form easily, and can take a long time to separate once formed. They are often formed while liquids are being mixed in the separating funnel. This can occur when small droplets are suspended in an aqueous solution. If an emulsion is formed, one technique used to separate the liquids is to slowly swirl the solution in the separating funnel. If the emulsion is not separated by this process, a small amount of saturated saline solution is added ("salting out").

Research is being done on alternative, more efficient techniques, mostly utilizing stir bars (stirrer bars) to decrease or even eliminate the chance of emulsification, thus decreasing the amount of waiting time.

== Safety concerns ==
The largest risk when using a separating funnel is that of pressure build-up inside it. Pressure accumulates during mixing if a gas evolving reaction or physical change occurs. This problem can be easily handled by simply opening the stopper at the top of the funnel routinely while mixing. More standard procedure is to turn the separating funnel upside down and open the stopcock to release the pressure as often as needed, a step known as 'venting'. The tip of the funnel should be pointed away from the body during venting.

== Gallery ==
1. Upper phase
2. Lower phase

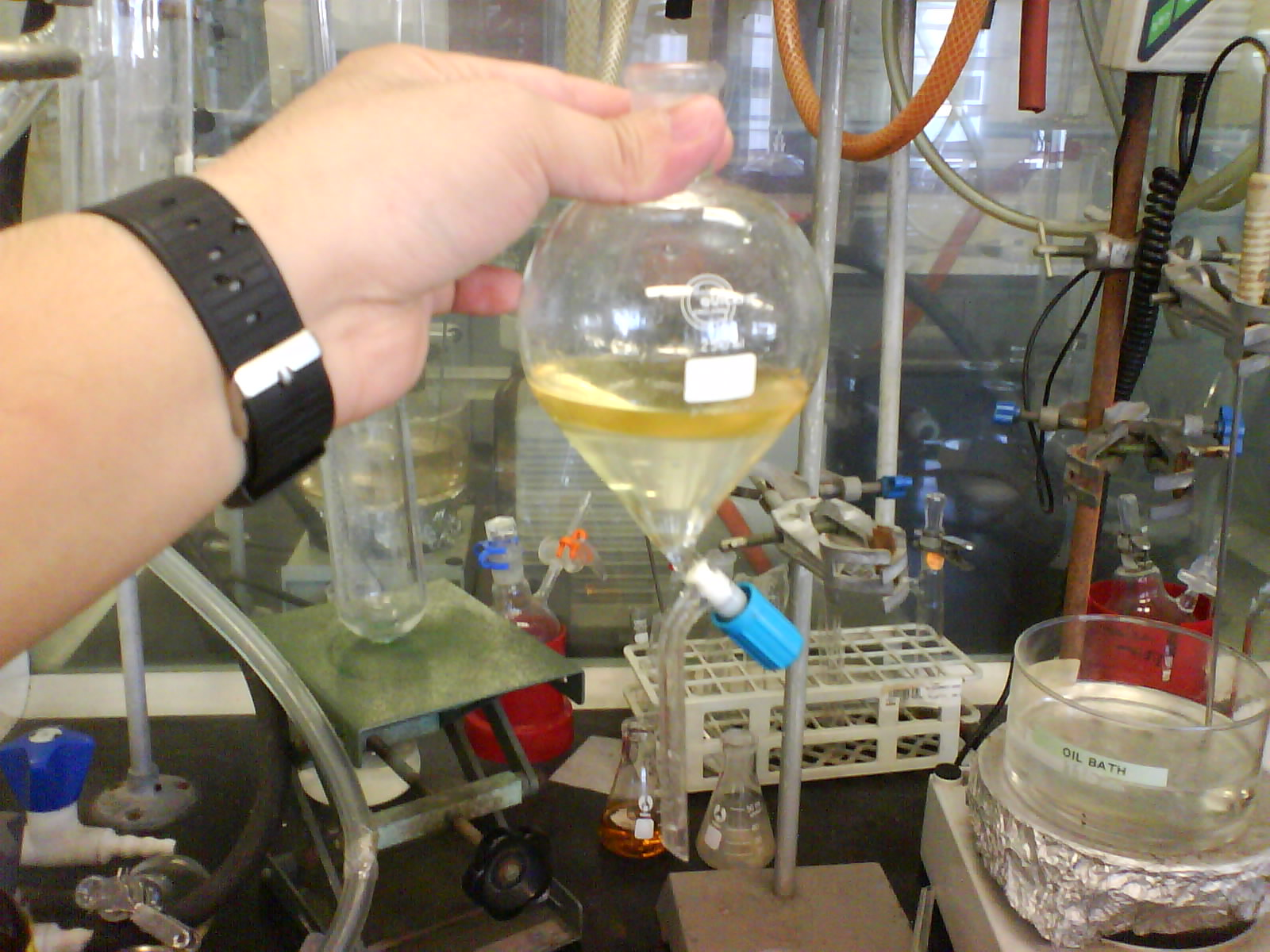
The ether layer with a dissolved yellow compound is on top and an aqueous layer is at the bottom

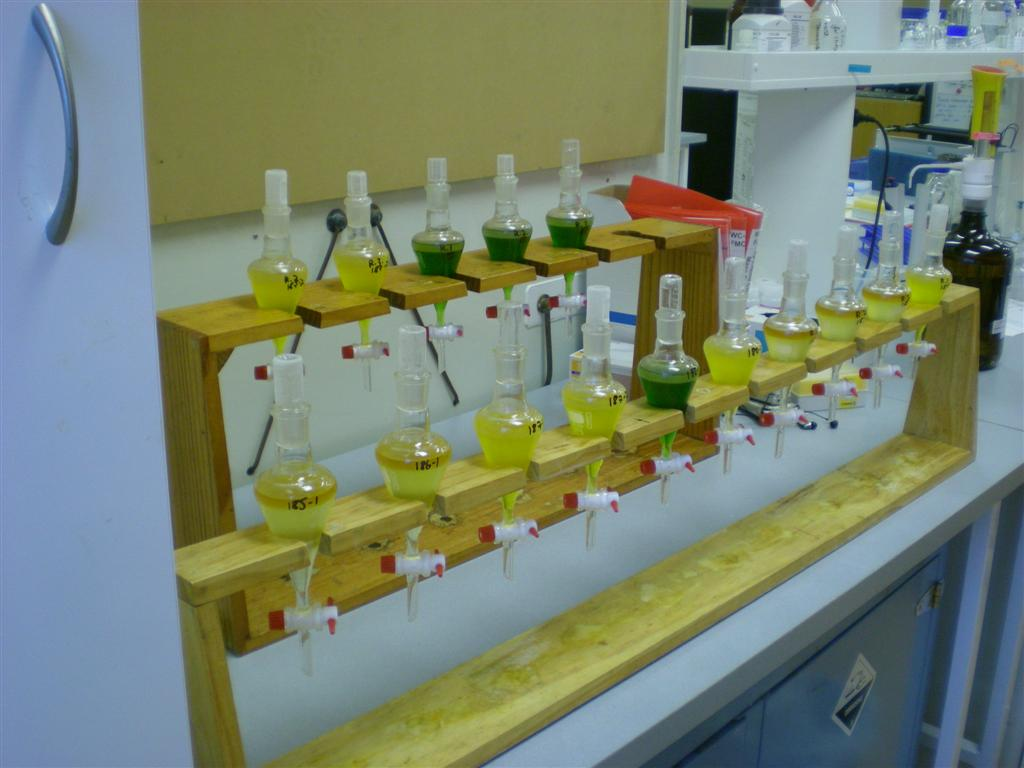
Apple, banana, carrot, and lettuce extraction using acetone, water, and dichloromethane. Lower layer is the organic layer.

== See also ==
- Decantation is a process of pouring off the top layer of liquid from a bottom layer of liquid or solid
- Decanter centrifuge
- Dropping funnels are similar in shape and design, and may be used as separatory funnels. They have standard taper ground glass joints at the stem.
- Partition coefficient is a measure of the distribution of an analyte between the two phases in a separation.
