= Tetrakis(trimethylphosphine)tungsten(II) trimethylphosphinate hydride =

[(Dimethylphosphino-κP)methyl-κC]hydrotetrakis(trimethylphosphine)tungsten
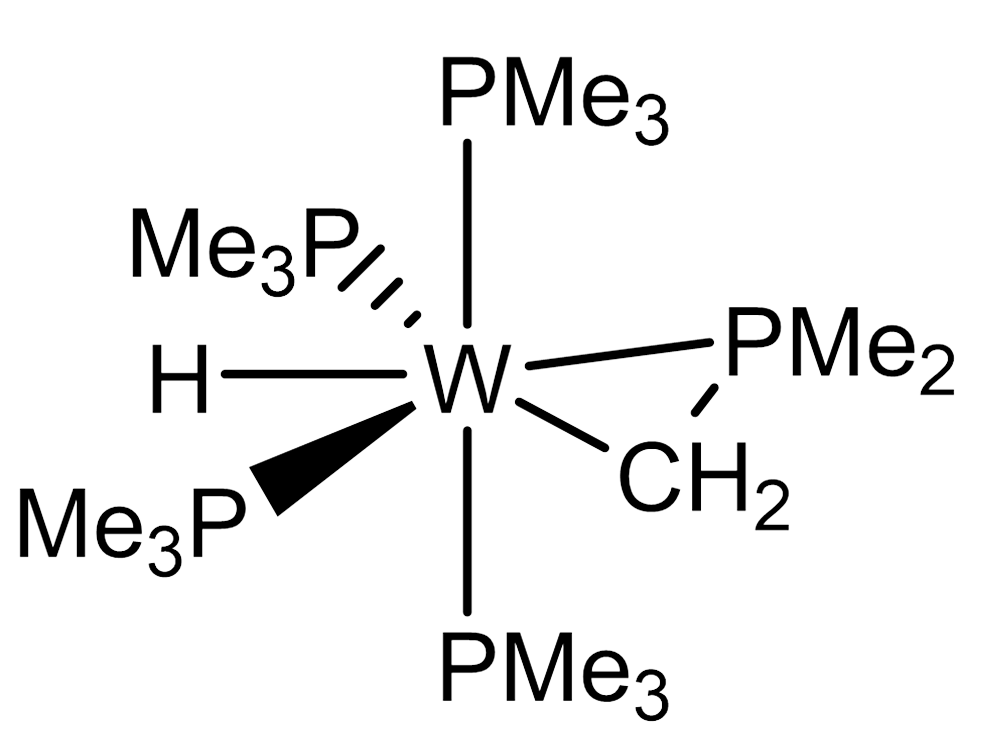

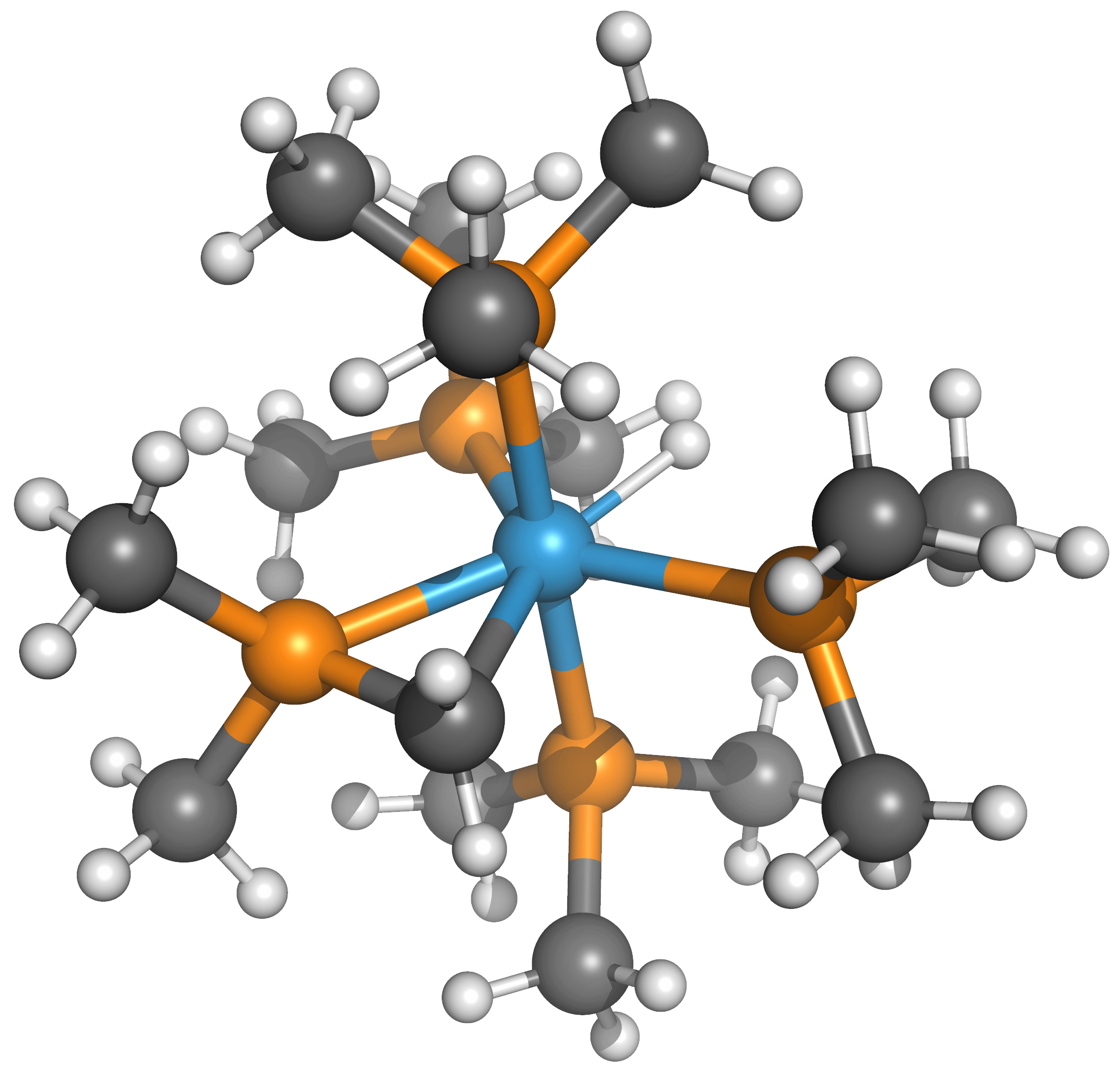

Names
- IUPAC name [(Dimethylphosphino-κP)methyl-κC]hydrotetrakis(trimethylphosphine)tungsten

Identifiers
CAS Number	95119-57-6
3D model (JSmol)	Interactive image
- InChI: InChI=1S/4C3H9P.C3H8P.W.H/c5*1-4(2)3;;/h4*1-3H3;1H2,2-3H3;; Key: JEOJFJRETFUFNG-UHFFFAOYSA-N
- SMILES: [H][W]CP(C)C.CP(C)C.CP(C)C.CP(C)C.CP(C)C

Properties
Chemical formula	C_{15}H_{45}P_{5}W
Molar mass	564.23 g·mol^{−1}
Appearance	Yellow crystalline solid
Solubility in water	Hydrolysis
- Except where otherwise noted, data are given for materials in their standard state (at 25 °C [77 °F], 100 kPa). Infobox references

Tetrakis(trimethylphosphine)tungsten(II) trimethylphosphinate hydride is the organotungsten compound with the formula W(PMe_{3})_{4}(η^{2}-CH_{2}PMe_{2})H. In this complex, the formal oxidation state of W is 2+, and the tungsten center has bonded four trimethylphosphine ligands. The remaining three ligands are a CH_{2}PMe_{2}, bonded in η^{2} fashion, and hydride. The complex reacts with many simple reagents.

== Synthesis ==
W(PMe_{3})_{4}(η^{2}-CH_{2}PMe_{2})H can be synthesized by treating tungsten hexachloride with trimethylphosphine and sodium.

Other techniques produce a family of related complexes. Thus excess PMe_{3} and H_{2} produces W(PMe_{3})_{4}(η^{2}-CH_{2}PMe_{2})H in a 3:1 mixture with W(PMe_{3})_{5}H_{2}, co-condensation produces only W(PMe_{3})_{4}(η^{2}-CH_{2}PMe_{2})H, and reduction with Na-K alloy requires vast PMe_{3} excess and only produces a mixture of W(PMe_{3})_{4}(η^{2}-CH_{2}PMe_{2})H and W(PMe_{3})_{6}.

W(PMe_{3})_{4}(η^{2}-CH_{2}PMe_{2})H is thermodynamically favored relative to W(PMe_{3})_{6}, as described in the equation:

W(PMe_{3})_{6} $\ce{<=>>}$ W(PMe_{3})_{4}(η^{2}−CH_{2}PMe_{2})H + PMe_{3} ΔG_{rxn} = –1.73 kcal mol^{−1}

W(PMe_{3})_{5}, a 16 electron, d^{6} complex, has been proposed as an unstable intermediate between W(PMe_{3})_{4}(η^{2}-CH_{2}PMe_{2})H and W(PMe_{3})_{6}. The rate-determining step from W(PMe_{3})_{6} is dissociation of PMe_{3}. Isotopic labeling and the NMR studies indicate that W(PMe_{3})_{4}(η^{2}-CH_{2}PMe_{2})H is fluxional such that all methyl groups are equivalenced.

== Reactivity ==
=== Small molecule substrates: H_{2}, CO, N_{2}, CO_{2}, SiH_{4} ===
W(PMe_{3})_{4}(η^{2}-CH_{2}PMe_{2})H reacts with H_{2} to give W(PMe_{3})_{5}(H)_{2}...

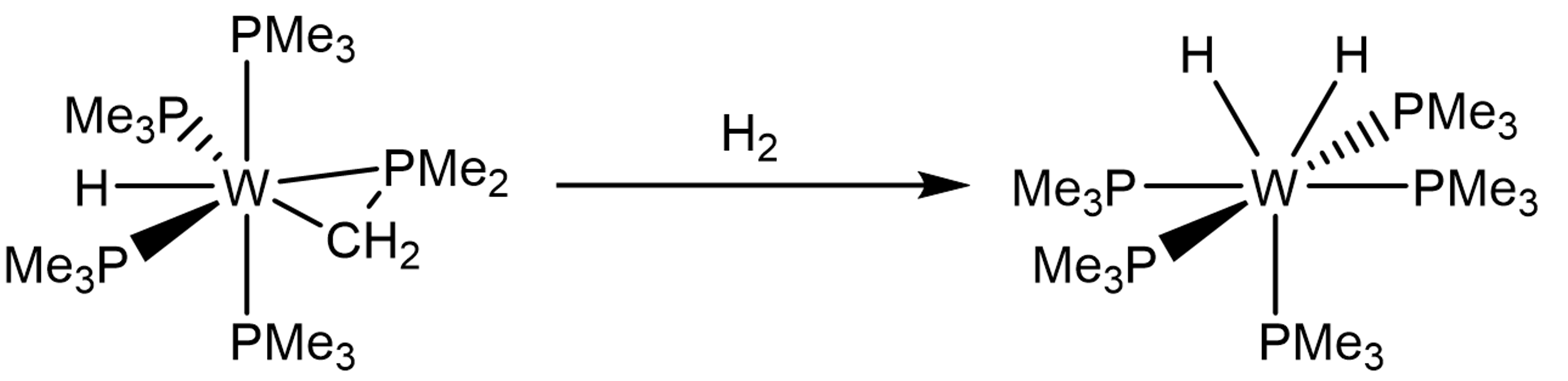
Reaction of W(PMe_{3})_{4}(η^{2}-CH_{2}PMe_{2})H with H_{2}

...and W(PMe_{3})_{4}(H)_{4}. With HD, W(PMe_{3})_{4}(η^{2}-CH_{2}PMe_{2})H converts to W(PMe_{3})_{5}HD or W(PMe_{3})_{4}(η^{2}-HD) in PMe_{3} solvent.

W(PMe_{3})_{4}(η^{2}-CH_{2}PMe_{2})H adds N_{2} to give W(PMe_{3})_{5}(N_{2}):

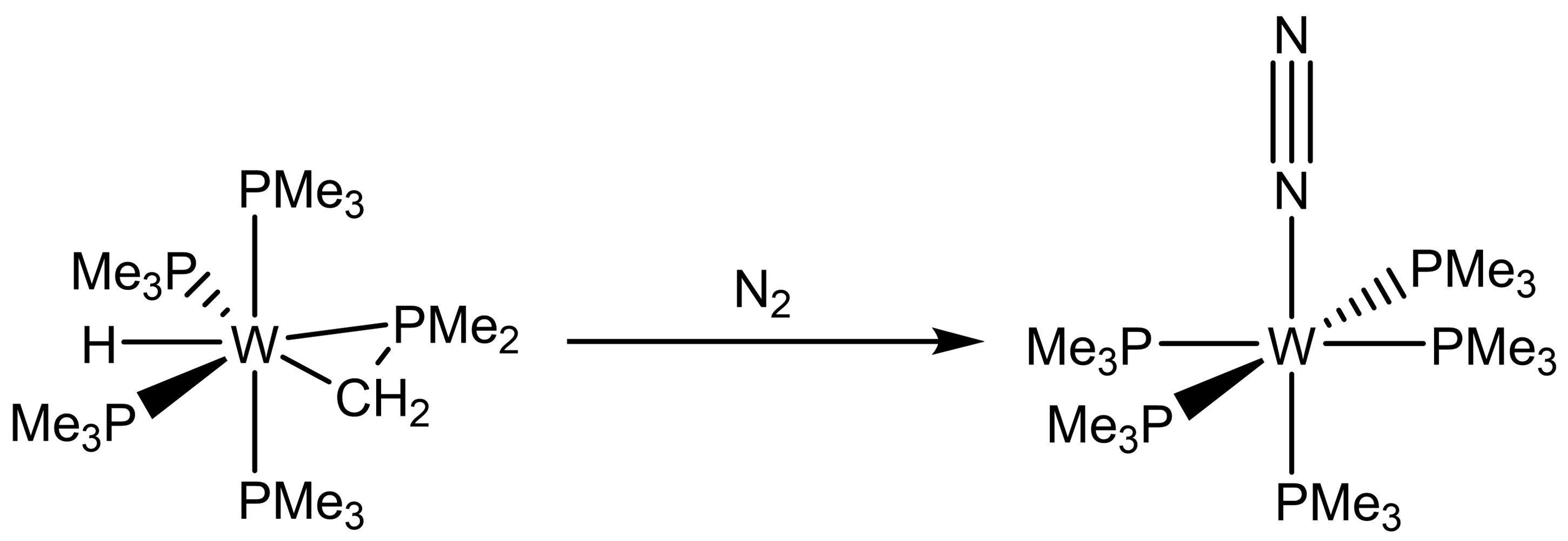
Reaction of W(PMe_{3})_{4}(η^{2}-CH_{2}PMe_{2})H with N_{2}

In 2 atmospheres of CO, W(PMe_{3})_{4}(η^{2}-CH_{2}PMe_{2})H gives fac-W(PMe_{3})_{3}(CO)_{3}:

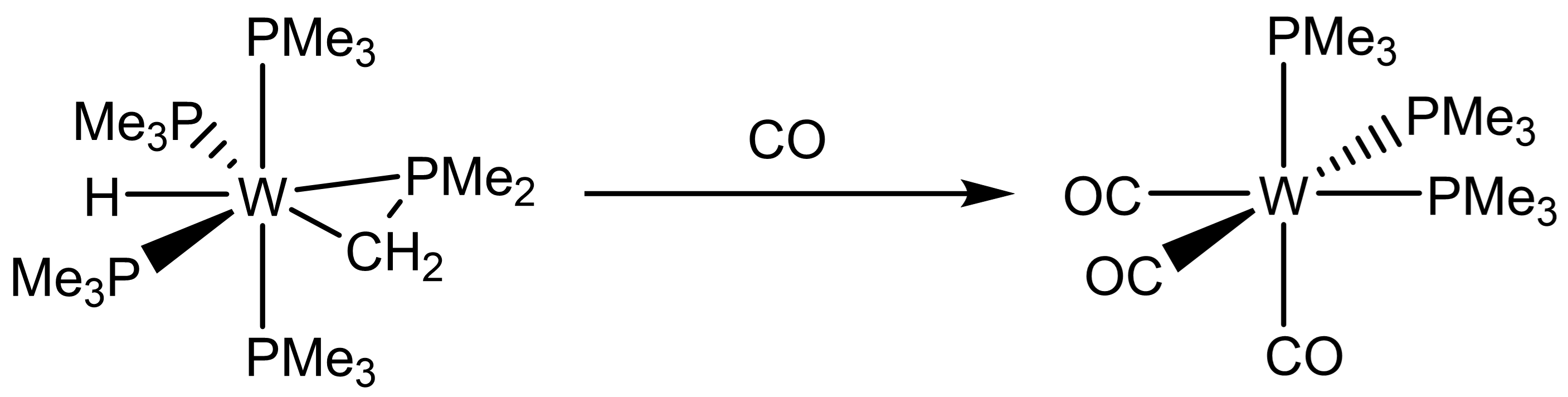
Reaction of W(PMe_{3})_{4}(η^{2}-CH_{2}PMe_{2})H with CO

3 atmosphere of a 1:1 CO_{2}/H_{2} gas mix to produce W(PMe_{3})_{4}(κ^{2}-O_{2}CO)H_{2} and a bimetallacycle:

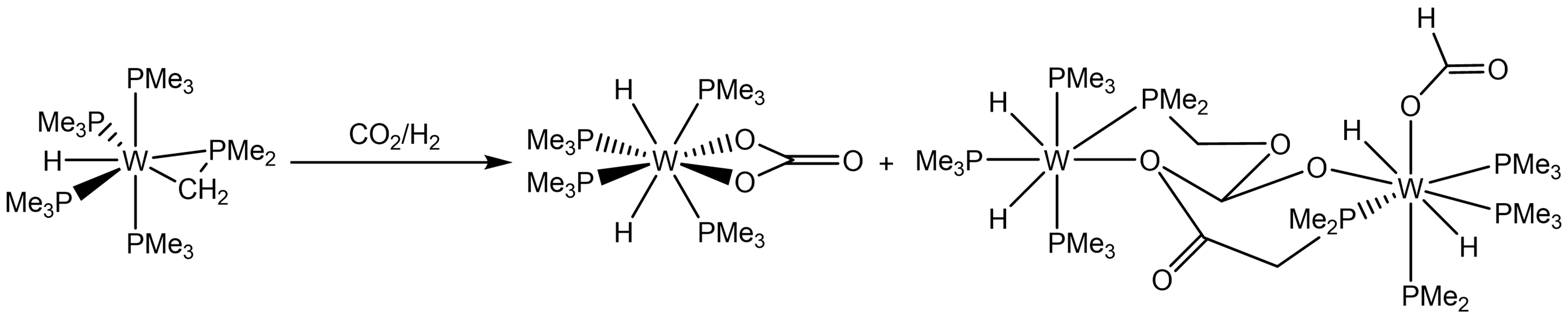
Reaction of W(PMe_{3})_{4}(η^{2}-CH_{2}PMe_{2})H with CO_{2}

The reaction of W(PMe_{3})_{4}(η^{2}-CH_{2}PMe_{2})H with SiH_{4} yields W(PMe_{3})_{4}(SiH_{3})_{2}H_{2}. Organosilanes give a variety of products:

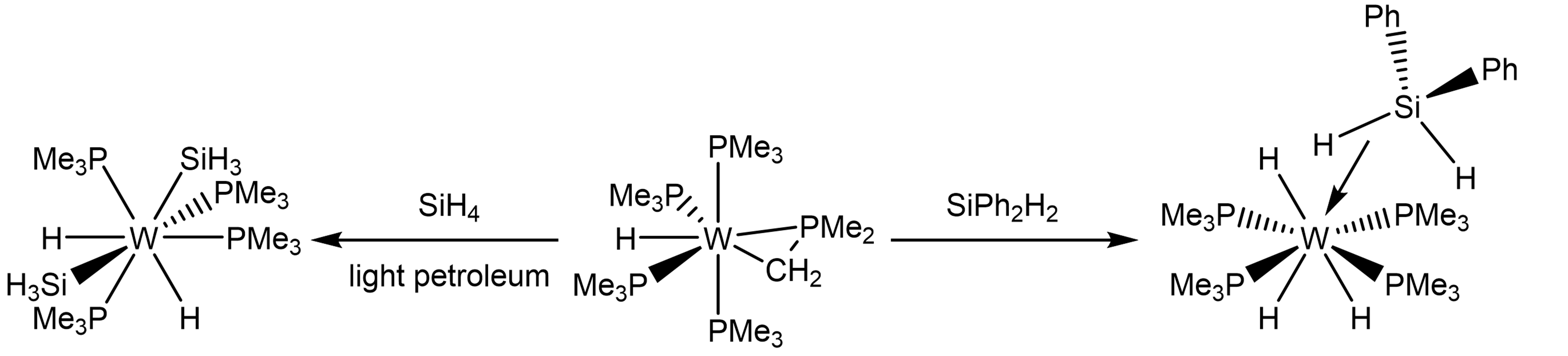
Reactions of W(PMe_{3})_{4}(η_{2}-CH_{2}PMe_{2})H with silanes

=== Acids ===
HBF_{4} reacts with W(PMe_{3})_{4}(η^{2}-CH_{2}PMe_{2})H in ether to give [W(PMe_{3})_{4}(OH)_{2}H_{2}][BF_{4}]_{2}. Several derivatives are known: W(PMe_{3})_{4}H_{4}, W(PMe_{3})_{4}F_{2}H_{2}, and [W(PMe_{3})_{4}F(H_{2}O)H_{2}]F.

Hydrogen chloride reacts as follows:

W(PMe_{3})_{4}(η^{2}-CH_{2}PMe_{2})H + 2 HCl → W(PMe_{3})_{4}Cl_{2}(H)_{2} + PMe_{3}

The corresponding dibromide and diiodide form by salt metathesis. Carboxylic acid reacts with W(PMe_{3})_{4}(η^{2}-CH_{2}PMe_{2})H to give hydride complexes, e.g., W(PMe_{3})_{4}(O_{2}CR)H.

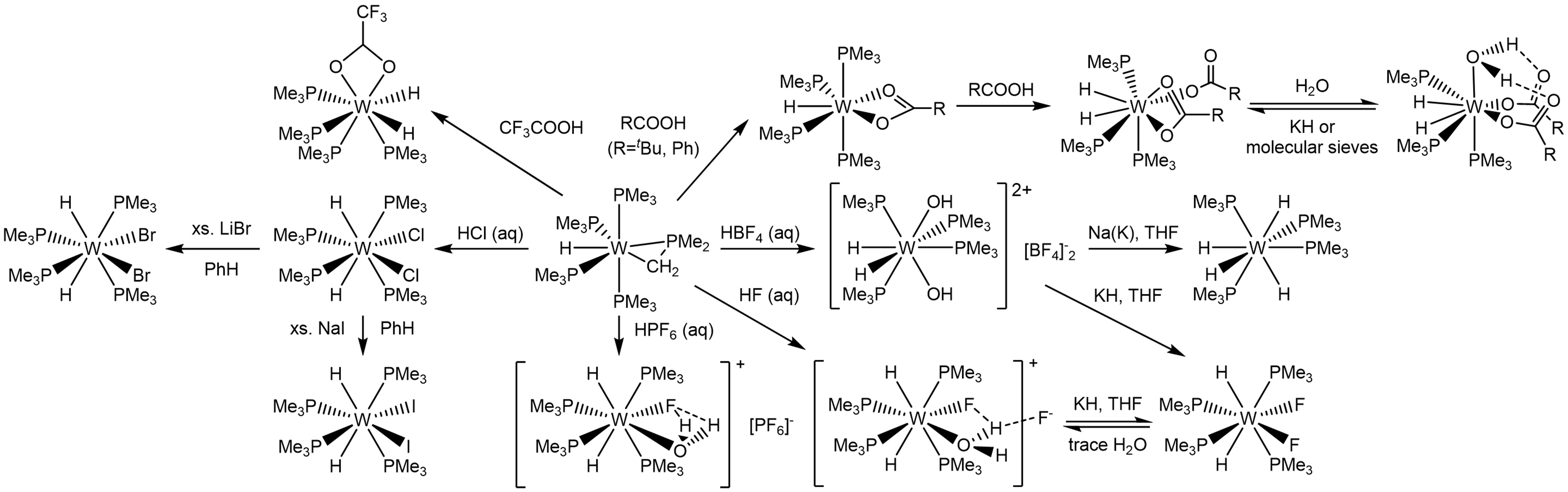
Reactions of W(PMe_{3})_{4}(η_{2}-CH_{2}PMe_{2})H with acids

=== π-systems ===
In 1-2 atmospheres of ethylene at room temperature, W(PMe_{3})_{4}(η^{2}-CH_{2}PMe_{2})H reacts to form trans-W(PMe_{3})_{4}(η^{2}-C_{2}H_{4})_{2}.

Upon subjecting W(PMe_{3})_{4}(η^{2}-CH_{2}PMe_{2})H to 2 atmospheres of ethylene at 60 °C in the presence of light petroleum for a week, W(PMe_{3})_{2}(η^{2}-C_{4}H_{6})_{2} is produced. W(PMe_{3})_{4}(η^{2}-CH_{2}PMe_{2})H will ligate to buta-1,3-diene when the latter is in vast excess and in the presence of light petroleum at 50 °C to make the same product as ethylene. W(PMe_{3})_{2}(η^{2}-C_{4}H_{6})_{2} produces yellow crystals.

Much like with ethylene, propylene (2 atm) also forms C-C bonds upon reaction with W(PMe_{3})_{4}(η^{2}-CH_{2}PMe_{2})H and light petroleum at 70 °C. The resultant product is W(PMe_{3})_{3}[η-CH_{2}=C(Me)CH=C(cis-Me)H]H_{2}.

W(PMe_{3})_{4}(η^{2}-CH_{2}PMe_{2})H, upon reaction with cyclopentadiene in light petroleum for five days, binds cyclopentadiene and dissociates two PMe_{3} ligands to generate W(η^{5}-C_{5}H_{5})(PMe_{3})_{3}H, W(PMe_{3})_{4}H_{4}, W(PMe_{3})_{3}H_{6}, and trace W(η^{5}-C_{5}H_{5})_{2}H_{2}. The crystals of this mixture are yellow and air-sensitive.

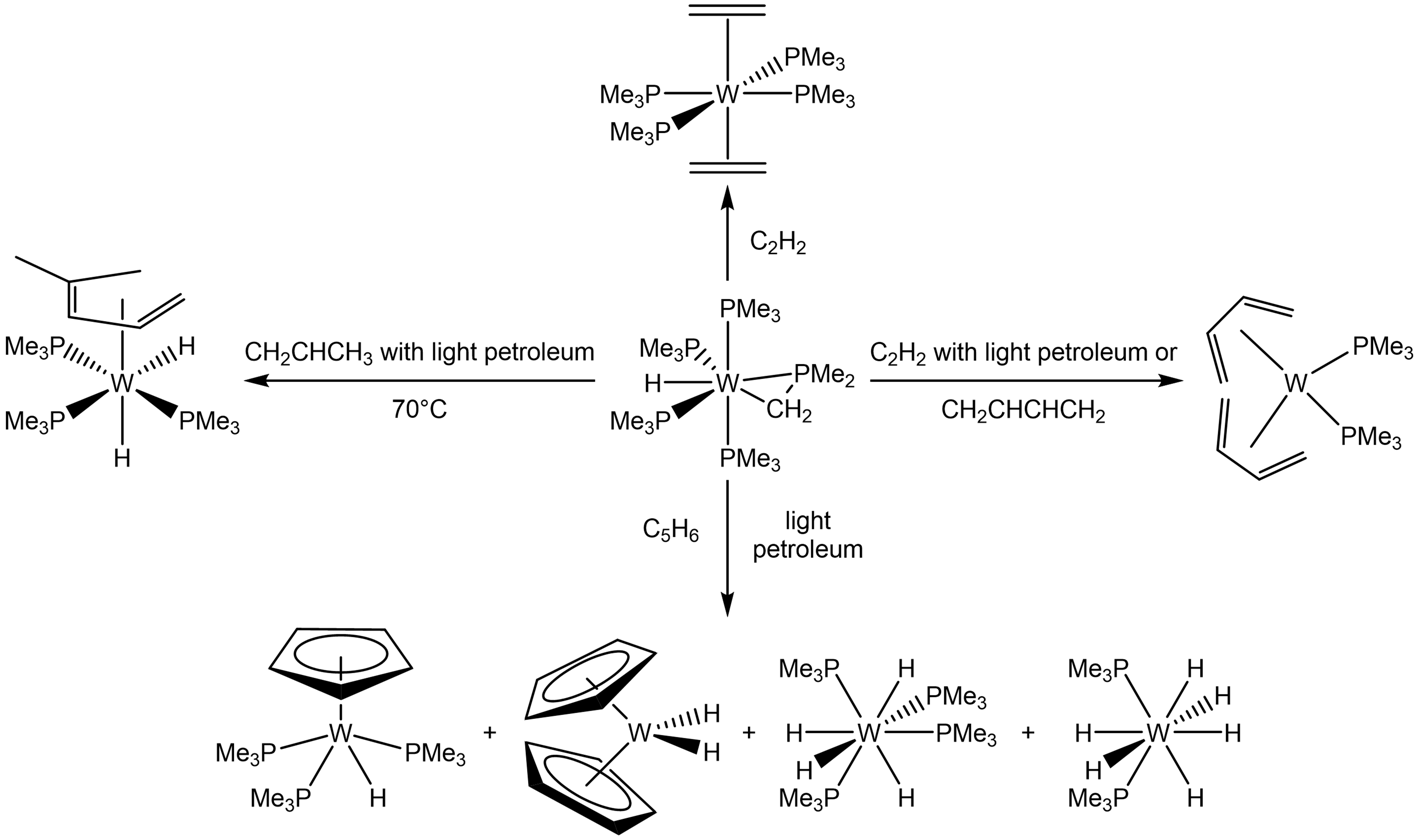
Reactions of W(PMe_{3})_{4}(η_{2}-CH_{2}PMe_{2})H with π-system containing hydrocarbons

In the reaction with quinoxaline (Qox^{H,H}H) and its derivatives 6-methylquinoxaline (Qox^{Me,H}H) and 6,7-dimethylquinoxaline (Qox^{Me,Me}H), W(PMe_{3})_{4}(η^{2}-CH_{2}PMe_{2})H forms [κ^{2}-C_{2}-C_{6}RR'H_{2}(NC)_{2}]W(PMe_{3})_{4}, (η^{4}-C_{2}N_{2}-Qox^{R,R'}H)W(PMe_{3})_{3}H_{2} (vide infra), and W(PMe_{3})_{4}H_{2} (R,R'=H, Me), wherein the first listed product is generated from C-C bond cleavage to form two W=C=B bond motifs. The latter two products are hypothesized to be formed from H_{2} generated from the C-C bond cleavage.

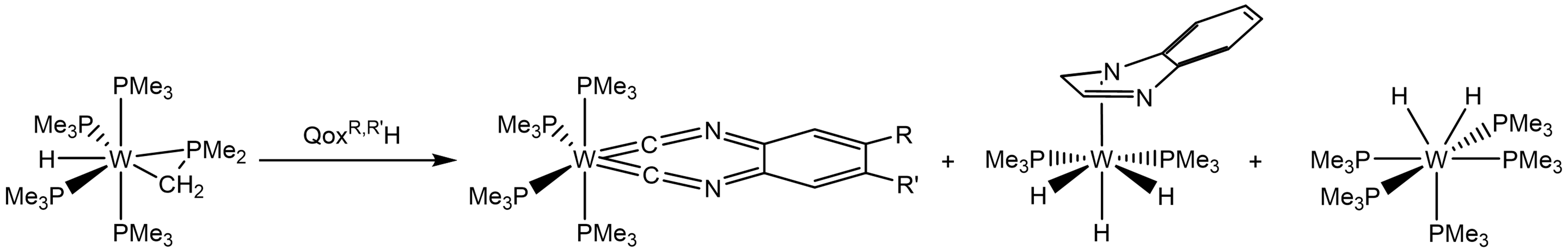
Reaction of W(PMe_{3})_{4}(η_{2}-CH_{2}PMe_{2})H with quinoxalines

=== Methanol ===
W(PMe_{3})_{4}(η^{2}-CH_{2}PMe_{2})H, upon addition of methanol in an ethylene atmosphere, can form W(PMe_{3})_{4}(CO)H_{2}.

W(PMe_{3})_{4}(η^{2}-CH_{2}PMe_{2})H, upon MeOH ligation in an η^{2}-fashion, dissociates PMe_{3} and forms W(PMe_{3})_{4}(η^{2}-CH_{2}O)H_{2}. This complex undergoes many similar reaction pathways as its precursor retron.

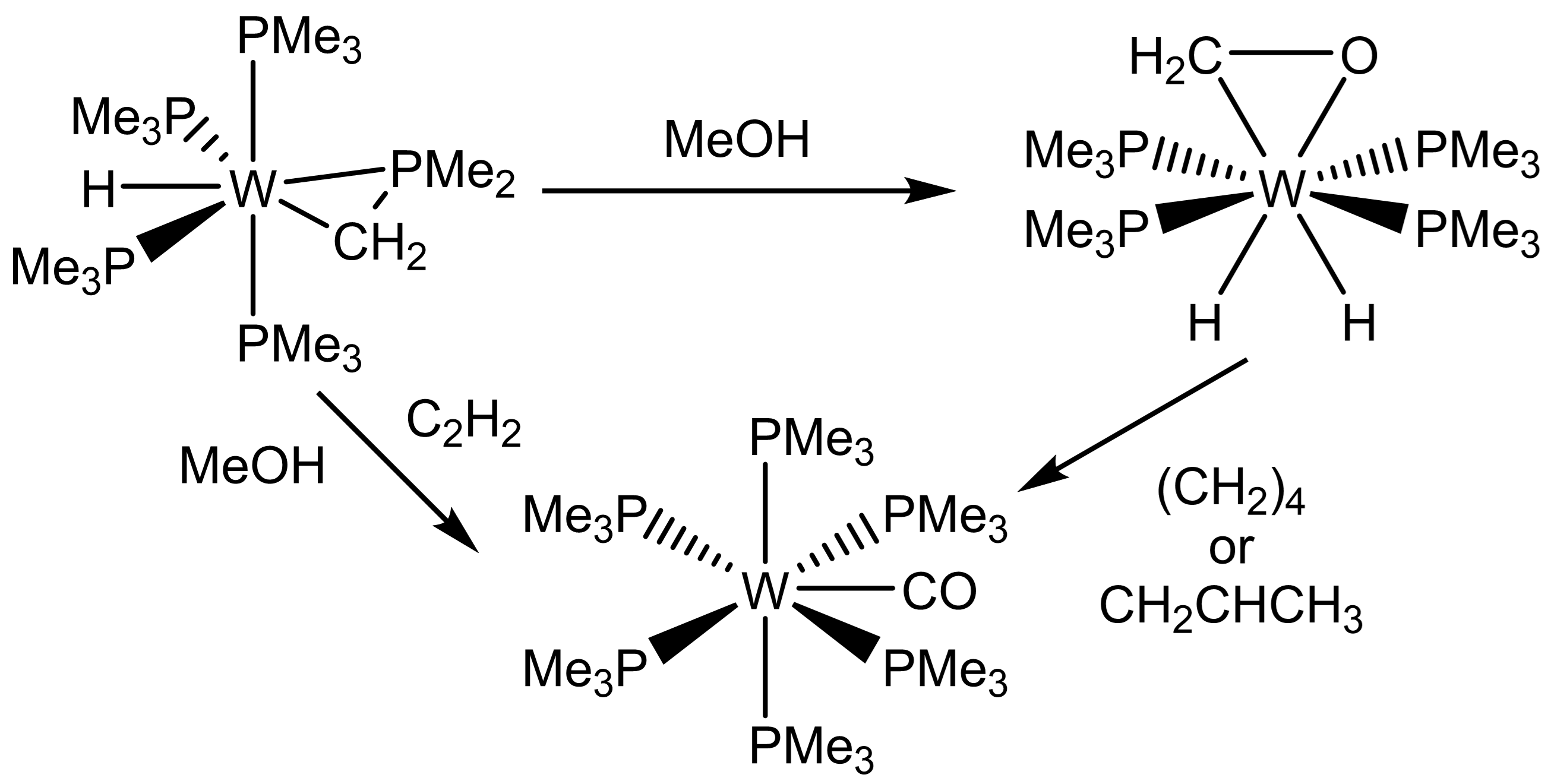
Reaction of W(PMe_{3})_{4}(η_{2}-CH_{2}PMe_{2})H with methanol

=== Tungsten-tetrel multiple bonding ===
W(PMe_{3})_{4}(η^{2}-CH_{2}PMe_{2})H, in pentane and at −20 °C, reacts with Ge(C_{6}H_{3}-2,6-Trip_{2})Cl (Trip=C_{6}H_{2}-2,4,6-^{i}Pr_{3}, ^{i}Pr=CH(CH_{3})_{2}) to dissociate PMe_{3} and generate trans-[Cl(H)(PMe_{3})_{3}W{=Ge(C_{6}H_{3}-2,6-Trip_{2})(CH_{2}PMe_{2})}]. This green, air-sensitive complex can heated at 50 °C with toluene or left in ambient conditions with either toluene or pentane to yield the Ge≡C bond-containing complex, trans-[Cl(PMe_{3})_{4}W≡Ge-C_{6}H_{3}-2,6-Trip_{2}]. This brown, air-sensitive complex can also be directly generated from W(PMe_{3})_{4}(η^{2}-CH_{2}PMe_{2})H by heating with toluene and Ge(C_{6}H_{3}-2,6-Trip_{2})Cl at 50 °C. trans-[Cl(PMe_{3})_{4}W≡Ge-C_{6}H_{3}-2,6-Trip_{2}] is, in turn, also a retron for further chemistry by substitution of the labile chloride ligand. Upon addition of lithium iodide in ether, chloride is substituted for iodide, forming red-brown trans-[I(PMe_{3})_{4}W≡Ge-C_{6}H_{3}-2,6-Trip_{2}]. With lithium dimethylamine in THF, the chloride is substituted for a hydride, generating red-brown, air-sensitive trans-[H(PMe_{3})_{4}W≡Ge-C_{6}H_{3}-2,6-Trip_{2}]. With potassium thiocynate in THF, chloride is substituted for thiocynate, forming dark brown trans-[(NCS)(PMe_{3})_{4}W≡Ge-C_{6}H_{3}-2,6-Trip_{2}].

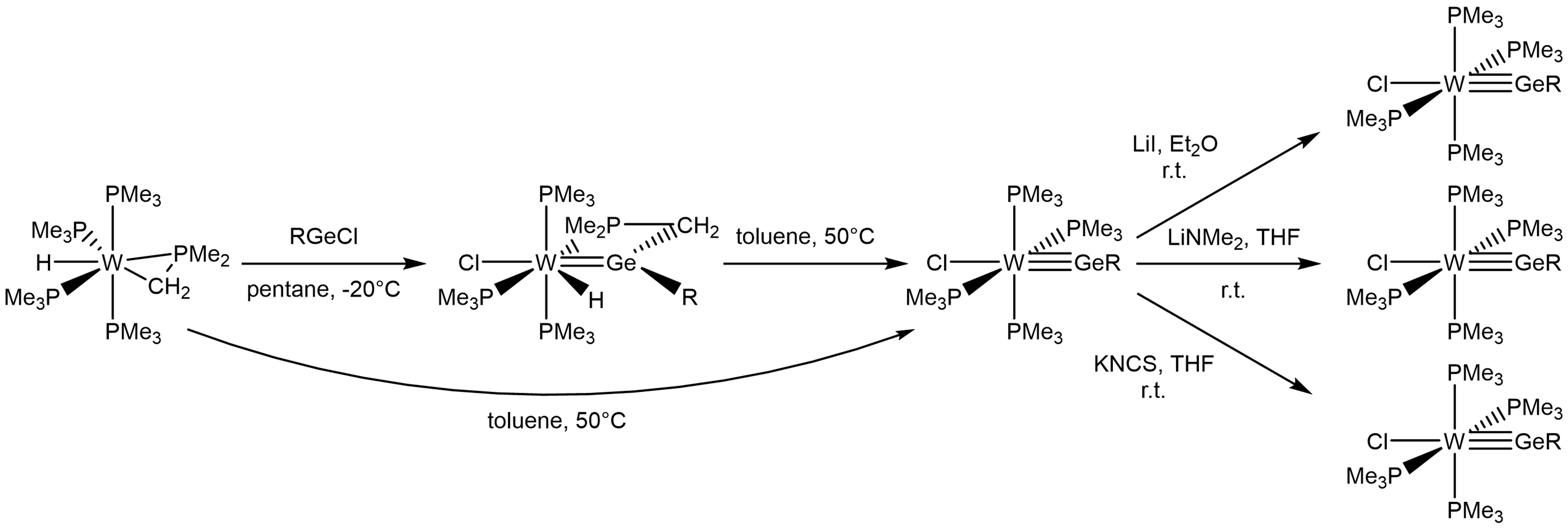
Reactions of W(PMe_{3})_{4}(η_{2}-CH_{2}PMe_{2})H with germanium

W(PMe_{3})_{4}(η^{2}-CH_{2}PMe_{2})H with 0.5 equivalent of {Pb(Trip)Br_{2}}_{2} and in toluene at 50 °C produces (PMe_{3})_{4}BrW{≡Pb(C_{6}H_{3}-2,6-Trip_{2})}. Upon addition of lithium dimethylamine in THF, Br(PMe_{3})_{4}W{≡Pb(C_{6}H_{3}-2,6-Trip_{2})} converts to brown, air-sensitive H(PMe_{3})_{4}W{≡Pb(C_{6}H_{3}-2,6-Trip_{2})}. Alternatively, W(PMe_{3})_{4}(η^{2}-CH_{2}PMe_{2})H, with 0.5 equivalent of {Pb(Trip)NMe_{2}}_{2} (produced from the reaction of {Pb(Trip)Br_{2}}_{2} with lithium dimethylamine) in toluene and at 80 °C, also produces H(PMe_{3})_{4}W{≡Pb(C_{6}H_{3}-2,6-Trip_{2})}.

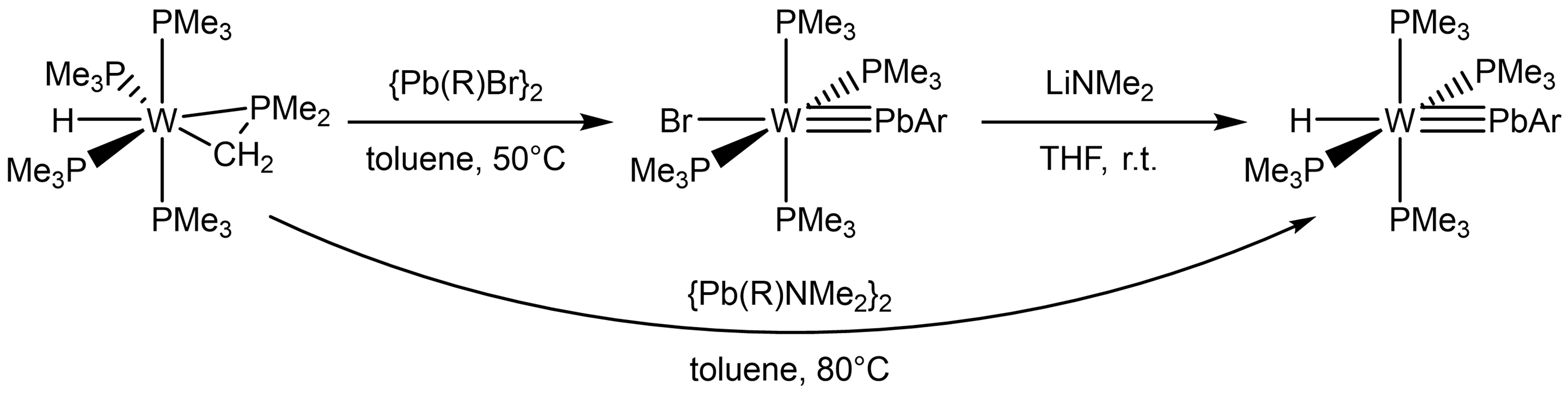
Reactions of W(PMe_{3})_{4}(η_{2}-CH_{2}PMe_{2})H with lead

=== Tungsten-chalcogenide multiple bonding ===
W(PMe_{3})_{4}(η^{2}-CH_{2}PMe_{2})H forms a variety of brightly colored complexes with terminal W=E bonds (E =2.718 S, Se, Te). H_{2}Se gives W(PMe_{3})_{4}Se(H)_{2}, which features a terminal selenide ligand and two hydride ligands. It reacts with H_{2}S and H_{2}Se to give W(PMe_{3})_{4}(Se)(S) and W(PMe_{3})_{4}(Se)2, respectively. In related behavior, H_{2}S reacts with W(PMe_{3})_{4}(η^{2}-CH_{2}PMe_{2})H to give W(PMe_{3})_{4}(SH_{2})H_{2}. The complex can be dehydrogenated to give trans-W(PMe_{3})_{4}S_{2}. trans-W(PMe_{3})_{4}Te_{2}, a rare complex with a terminal telluride ligand can be produced as well. Since H_{2}Te is not easily available, elemental Te in the presence of PMe_{3} was used, implicating a role for the phosphine telluride Me_{3}P=Te.

The dichalcogenides W(PMe_{3})_{4}(E)_{2} (E =S, Se, Te) reversibly bind aldehydes to give W(PMe_{3})_{2}E_{2}(η^{2}-OCHR) (R = H, Ph). Related ^{t}BuNC complexes have also been produced, e.g., trans, trans, trans-W(PMe_{3})_{2}(CN^{t}Bu)_{2}Se_{2}.

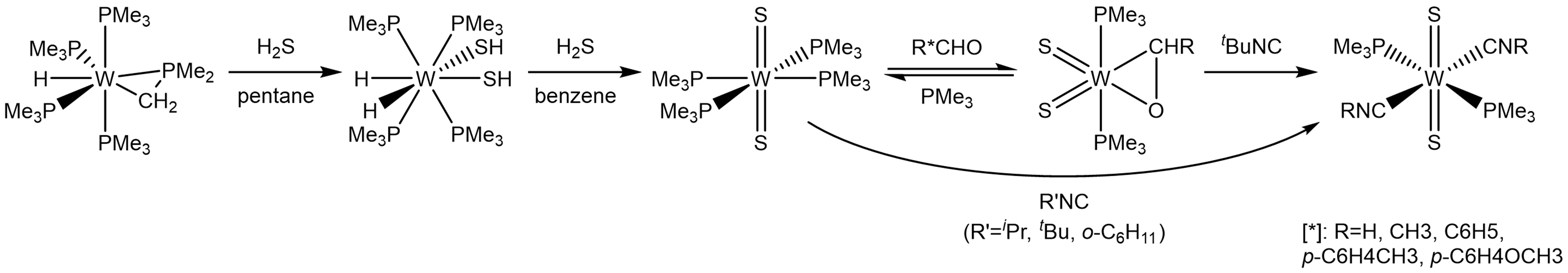
Reactions of W(PMe_{3})_{4}(η_{2}-CH_{2}PMe_{2})H with sulfide

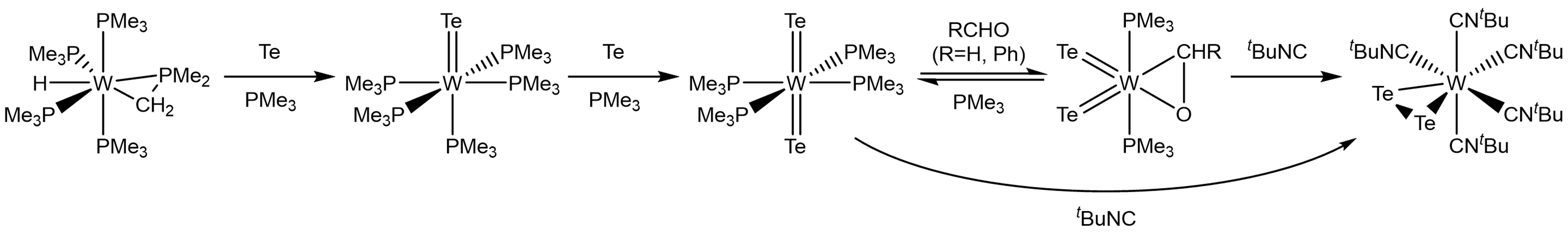
Reactions of W(PMe_{3})_{4}(η_{2}-CH_{2}PMe_{2})H with telluride

=== Hydrodesulfurization ===
When treated with thiophenes, benzothiophene, and dibenzothiophene, W(PMe_{3})_{4}(η^{2}-CH_{2}PMe_{2})H inserts into the C-S bonds. All of these complexes react further with H_{2}, resulting in hydrogenolysis of the C-S bonds. Such reactions are reminiscent of W-catalyzed hydrodesulfurization, a major process in refining petroleum.

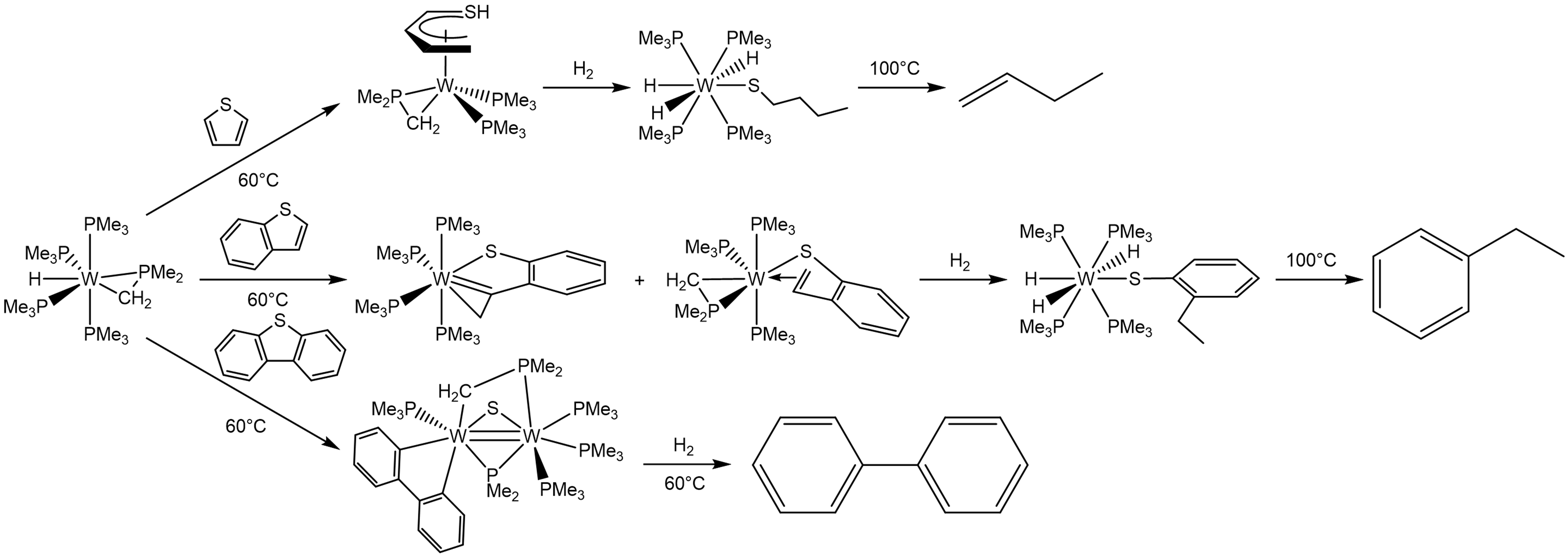
Dehydrosulfurization reactions of W(PMe_{3})_{4}(η_{2}-CH_{2}PMe_{2})H with thiophenes

=== C-H bond activation ===
W(PMe_{3})_{4}(η^{2}-CH_{2}PMe_{2})H reacts with phenols forming four- and five-membered oxometallacycles. With PhOD, the first step is the deuterolysis of the W–C bond, forming W(PMe_{3})_{4}(PMe_{2}CH_{2}D)(OPh)H. These phenoxide complexes are further reactive with H_{2}

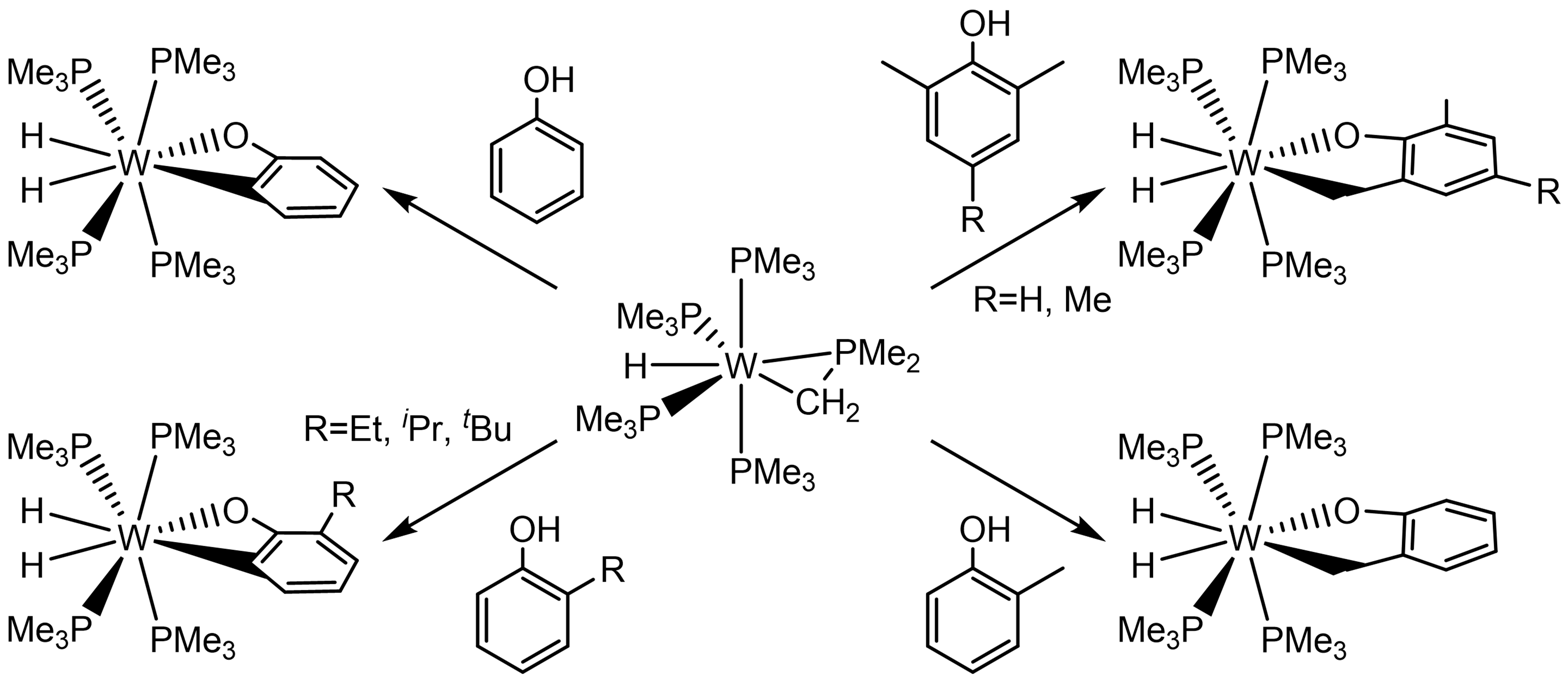
Reactions of W(PMe_{3})_{4}(η^{2}-CH_{2}PMe_{2})H with phenols

More complex phenols, e.g., 2,2′-methylenebis(4,6-dimethylphenol) and calixarenes, are also reactive toward W(PMe_{3})_{4}(h^{2}-CH_{2}PMe_{2})H.

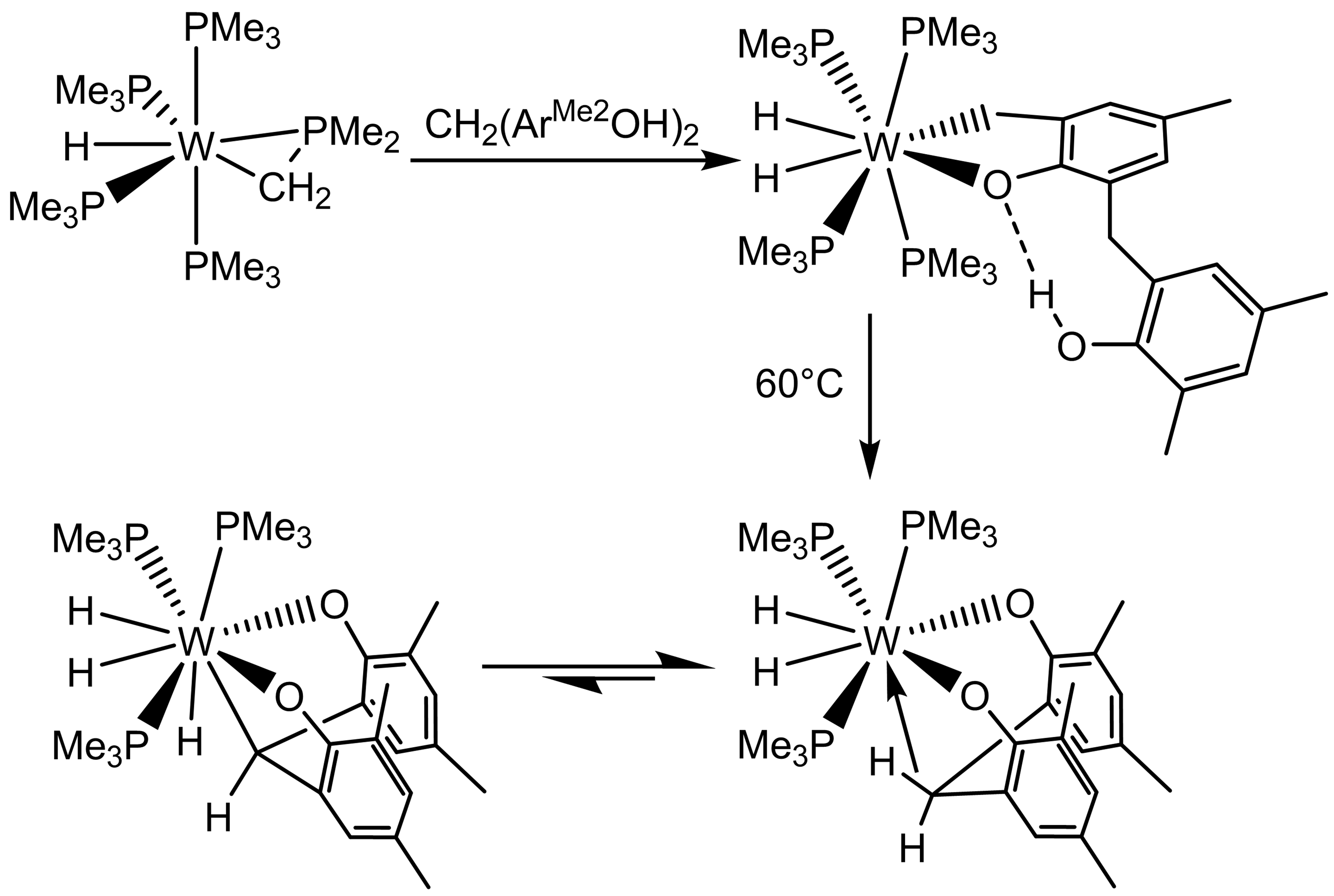
Reaction of W(PMe_{3})_{4}(η_{2}-CH_{2}PMe_{2})H with biphenol

.

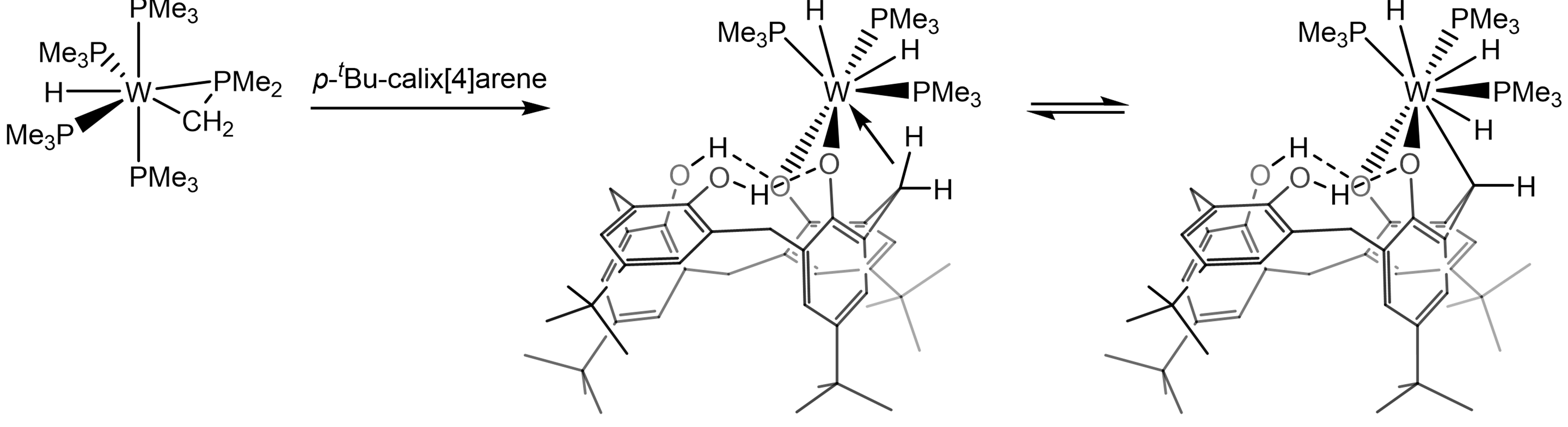
Reaction of W(PMe_{3})_{4}(η^{2}-CH_{2}PMe_{2})H with para-tert-butylcalix[4]arene

=== Alkylidene generation ===
Upon the addition of bromobenzene, iodobenzene, or para-bromotoluene, W(PMe_{3})_{4}(η^{2}-CH_{2}PMe_{2})H form the cation [W(PMe_{3})_{4}(η^{2}-CHPMe_{2})H]^{+} with the corresponding halide anion.

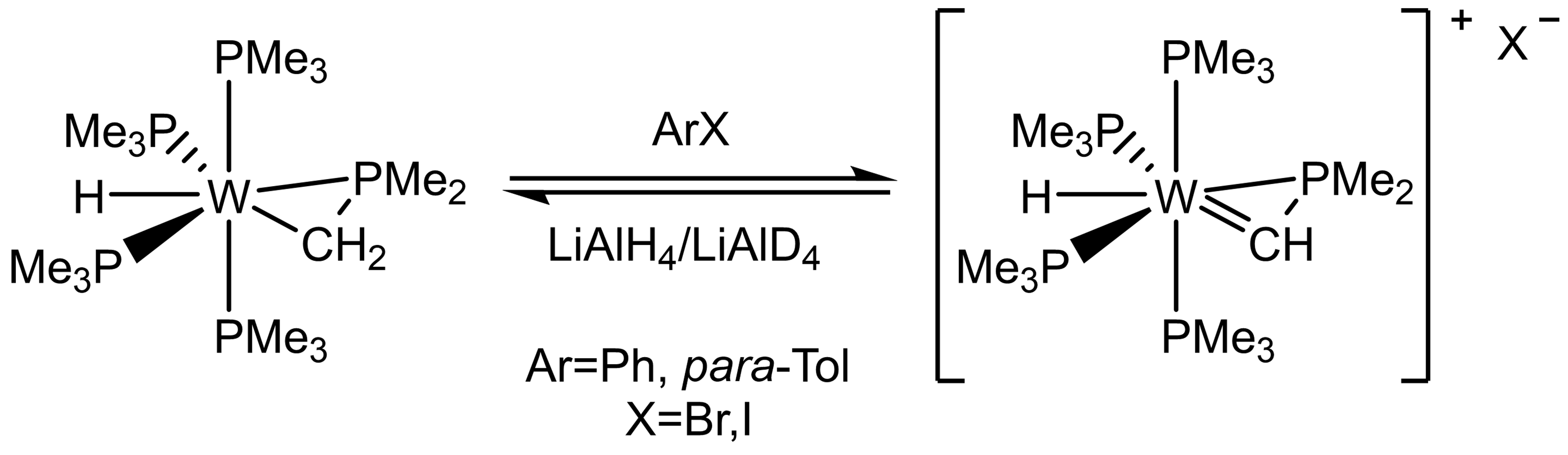
Reaction of W(PMe_{3})_{4}(η^{2}-CH_{2}PMe_{2})H with aryl halide to generate an alkylidene

== Theoretical work ==
=== C-C bond activation mechanism ===
The novel activation of the aromatic C-C bond in QoxH by W(PMe_{3})_{4}(η^{2}-CH_{2}PMe_{2})H under relatively mundane conditions inspired mechanistic theorizations. In their original publication, Sattler and Parkin suggested a mechanism in QoxH first acts as an L-type ligand from the N lone pair. The Qox ligand then changes its bonding behavior, with the bonding atoms shifting counterclockwise per Qox's numbering scheme. Upon reaching η^{2}-C_{2} binding, the complex undergoes reductive elimination of its two hydrides to form H_{2}. Finally, the complex cleaves its C-C bond to form the two W=C bonds.

Miscione and coworkers – using the B3LYP functional with energy-adjusted pseudopotential and DZVP basis sets — provided the first computational study of the proposed mechanism, wherein they provided a few pathways, building on Sattler and Parkin's work. The first pathway suggests that the hydride moves towards the tucked-in alkyl ligand to form W(PMe_{3})_{5} before QoxH binds. Upon the loss of a PMe_{3} ligand, Qox can then bond in an η^{2}-N,C fashion, forming a hydride which subsequently moves to be trans to Qox. In the second pathway, PMe_{3} occurs first, followed by QoxH's ligation. Then, the agostic interaction is transformed into a standard PMe_{3} L-type ligand to join the first pathway in following the original proposed mechanism. The third pathway diverges from the first pathway at W(PMe_{3})_{5}, wherein Qox instead interacts at the 2-H site before either bonding in a κ^{1}-C fashion or losing a PMe_{3} to interact with both the 2-H and 3-H sites. Both intermediates then form (along with the loss of PMe_{3} in the former complex) a κ^{1}-C complex with a 3-H interaction, before rejoining the original mechanism at the η^{2}-C_{2} complex. Of these paths, path 2 is the least favored due to the ~30–40 kcal/mol energy barrier in breaking the agnostic interaction. Paths 1 and 3 are reported to be of roughly equal thermodynamic favorability with energy barriers mostly around 10–20 kcal/mol, until the maximum of the energy surface, the three-membered ring-containing η^{2}-C_{2} intermediate (33.7 kcal/mol higher than W(PMe_{3})_{4}(η^{2}-CH_{2}PMe_{2})H). Miscione and coworker's results substantiate Sattler and Parkin's hypothesis that the ring strain in the η^{2}-C_{2} complex facilitates the C-C bond cleavage. They also report the reaction as being slightly net endergonic by 3.3 kcal/mol.

Theoretical mechanisms (transition states not shown) for the cleavage of quinoxaline's aromatic C=C bond by W(PMe_{3})_{4}(η^{2}-CH_{2}PMe_{2})H. Sattler and Parkin's original proposed mechanism is highlighted in red.

Liu et al. — using the B3LYP* functional with the LANL2DZ and 6-31G(d,f) basis sets – proposed two mechanisms based on Sattler and Parkin's original proposal. Both pathways start by dissociating both equatorial PMe_{3} ligands in the beginning before binding QoxH and generating a κ^{1}-N QoxH ligand. It then switches to η^{2}-N,C-Qox with a hydride which must move to be trans to Qox. κ^{1}-N Qox then transitions to κ^{1}-C Qox, followed by the transformation into η^{2}-N,C Qox. Dissociation of PMe_{3} follows suite. Liu et al.'s mechanism suggests that the C-C bond is broken at this stage, with a two electron oxidation of tungsten to form a double bond to the already bound carbon and a single bond to the other. The latter carbon's C-H bond forms an agostic interaction with tungsten to account for the lost electron density. The complex then gains its second W–C bond along with a hydride ligand. At this point, the two pathways branch. In the first pathway, an axial PMe_{3} moves down to the equatorial plane along with loss of the W=C bonds and reformation of the C-C bond, allowing another PMe_{3} to associate and rejoining the original mechanism at the dihydride-containing η^{2}-C_{2} Qox complex. The second pathway sees the two hydride ligands move such that they are cis to the W=C bonds before undergoing reductive elimination. PMe_{3} then associates, forming the final complex. Liu et al. claims that the final step to C-C bond cleavage is the concerted, not stepwise, elimination of H_{2} and formation W=C bonds. Per their calculations, Sattler and Parkin's mechanism spans a range of 42.0 kcal/mol energy range, in large part due to the aforementioned concerted step. The second pathway was calculated to have energy barriers of ~10 kcal/mol in all steps post-branching, leaving the second PMe_{3} dissociation as the highest energy barrier in the mechanism. Liu et al.'s calculations suggest that the mechanism is exergonic, releasing a net 9.2 kcal/mol of energy.

Li and Yoshizawa – using the B3LYP* functional with the LANL2TZ(f) and 6-31G(d,f) basis sets – also proposed two mechanisms which start with ligand dissociations. Both mechanisms start with the dissociation of an equatorial PMe_{3} ligand, before diverging. The first pathway sees the dissociation of the second equatorial PMe_{3}, leaving the agostic interaction and the hydride. This complex then binds to QoxH, generating a κ^{1}-N QoxH ligand. Qox then changes its binding to the η^{2}-N,C fashion, as well generating a hydride bond, before breaking the agostic interaction to form a PMe_{3} L-type interaction. Another PMe_{3} ligates before Qox switches to η^{2}-C_{2}-type bonding as well as an H_{2} ligand. H_{2} dissociation, followed by C-C bond cleavage, then leads to the final product. In the second pathway, the agostic bond is broken for a PMe_{3} L-type interaction after the first PMe_{3} dissociation. QoxH then binds in a κ^{1}-N fashion before changing to η^{2}-N,C with a hydride bond to tungsten and rejoining pathway 1. Li and Yoshizawa concluded that, between their pathways, pathway 1 is the most thermodynamically favorable. The reformation of PMe_{3} after immediately after the first PMe_{3} dissociation in pathway 2 has a barrier of 26.3 kcal/mol relative to W(PMe_{3})_{4}(η^{2}-CH_{2}PMe_{2})H. In contrast, the energy maximum of pathway 1 is from the H_{2} dissociation step shared by both pathways. Overall, Li and Yoshizawa's work suggest that the C-C bond mechanism is exergonic overall, with the product being 18.5 kcal/mol lower in energy relative to W(PMe_{3})_{4}(η^{2}-CH_{2}PMe_{2})H.

=== η^{4}-C_{2}N_{2} quinoxaline binding ===
The η^{4}-C_{2}N_{2}-QoxH ligand is a novel binding behavior discovered from the reaction of W(PMe_{3})_{4}(η^{2}-CH_{2}PMe_{2})H with QoxH. Miscione et al. and Liu et al. also investigated these mechanisms. The former group suggests that upon formation of W(PMe_{3})_{5} (vide infra), the tungsten undergoes the oxidative addition of H_{2}, forming hydride bonds. Then, one PMe_{3} ligand is dissociated, allowing QoxH to bind, first in a η^{2}-N,C fashion before switching to the final η^{4}-C_{2}N_{2} fashion via a 7.3 kcal/mol rearrangement energy barrier. The latter group suggests that one PMe_{3} first dissociates, followed by the oxidative addition of H_{2}, forming an ML_{6} complex. One of the axial PMe_{3} ligands is lost, allowing QoxH to bind, forming the η^{4}-C_{2}N_{2}-QoxH ligand. Both sets of calculations agree that the mechanism is net exergonic, with the product being ~20 kcal/mol lower in energy than W(PMe_{3})_{4}(η^{2}-CH_{2}PMe_{2})H.

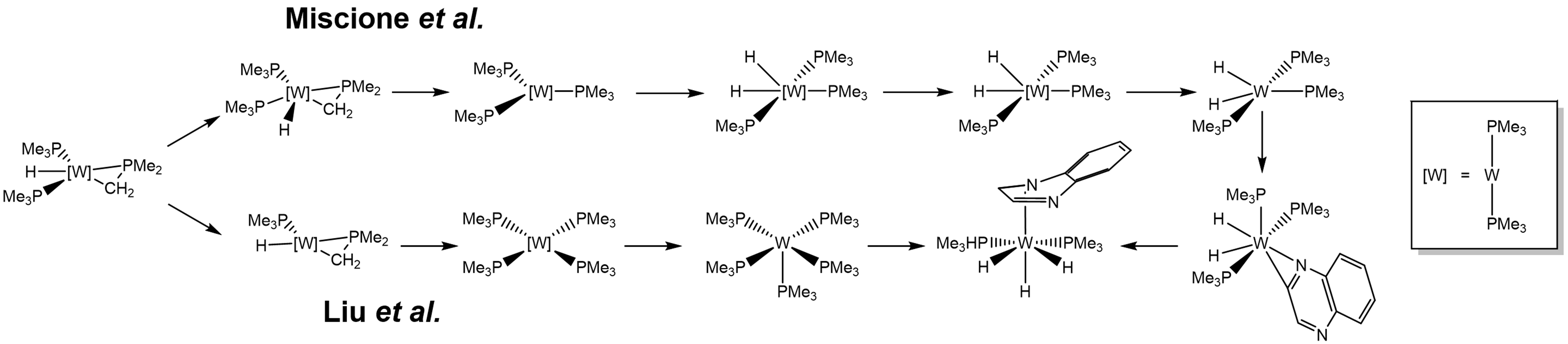
Theoretical mechanisms (transition states not shown) for the binding of quinoxaline to W(PMe_{3})_{4}(η^{2}-CH_{2}PMe_{2})H in an η^{4}-C_{2}N_{2} fashion.

== See also ==
- Hexakis(trimethylphosphine)tungsten
