= (Benzylideneacetone)iron tricarbonyl =

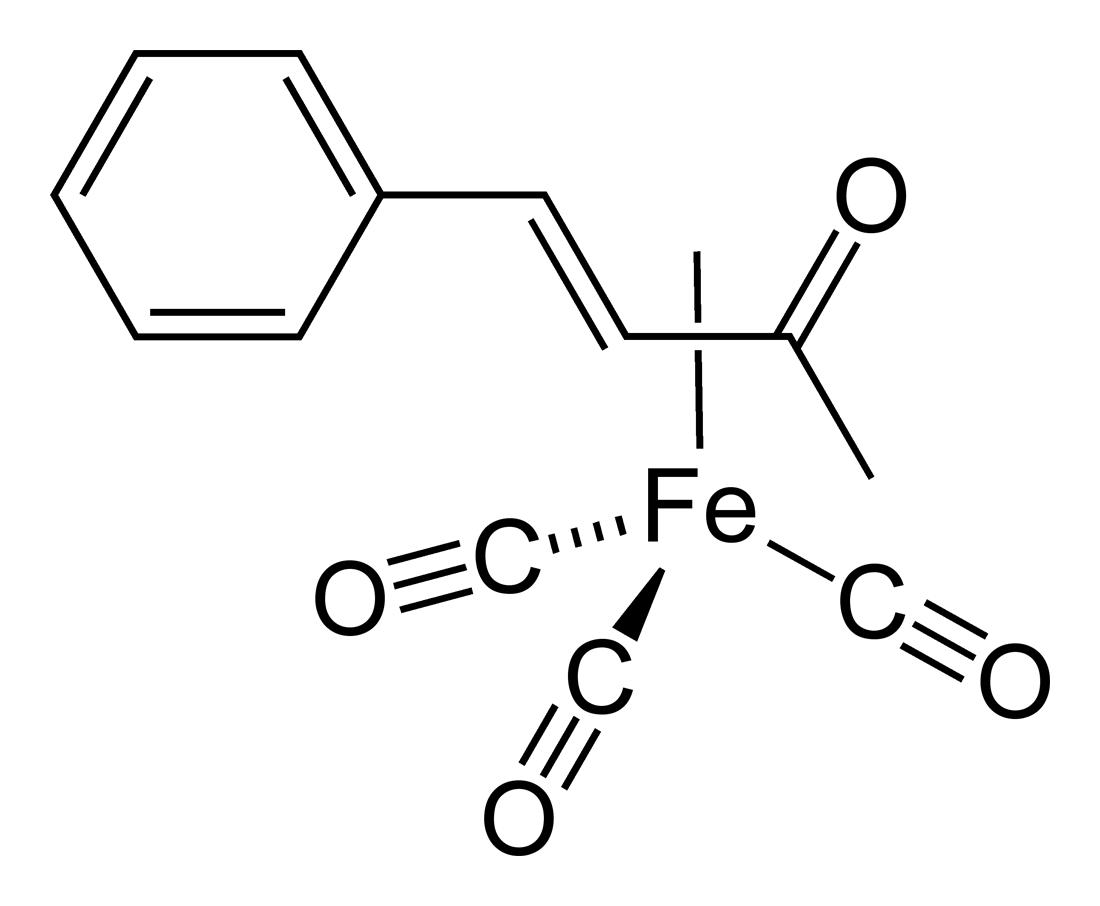

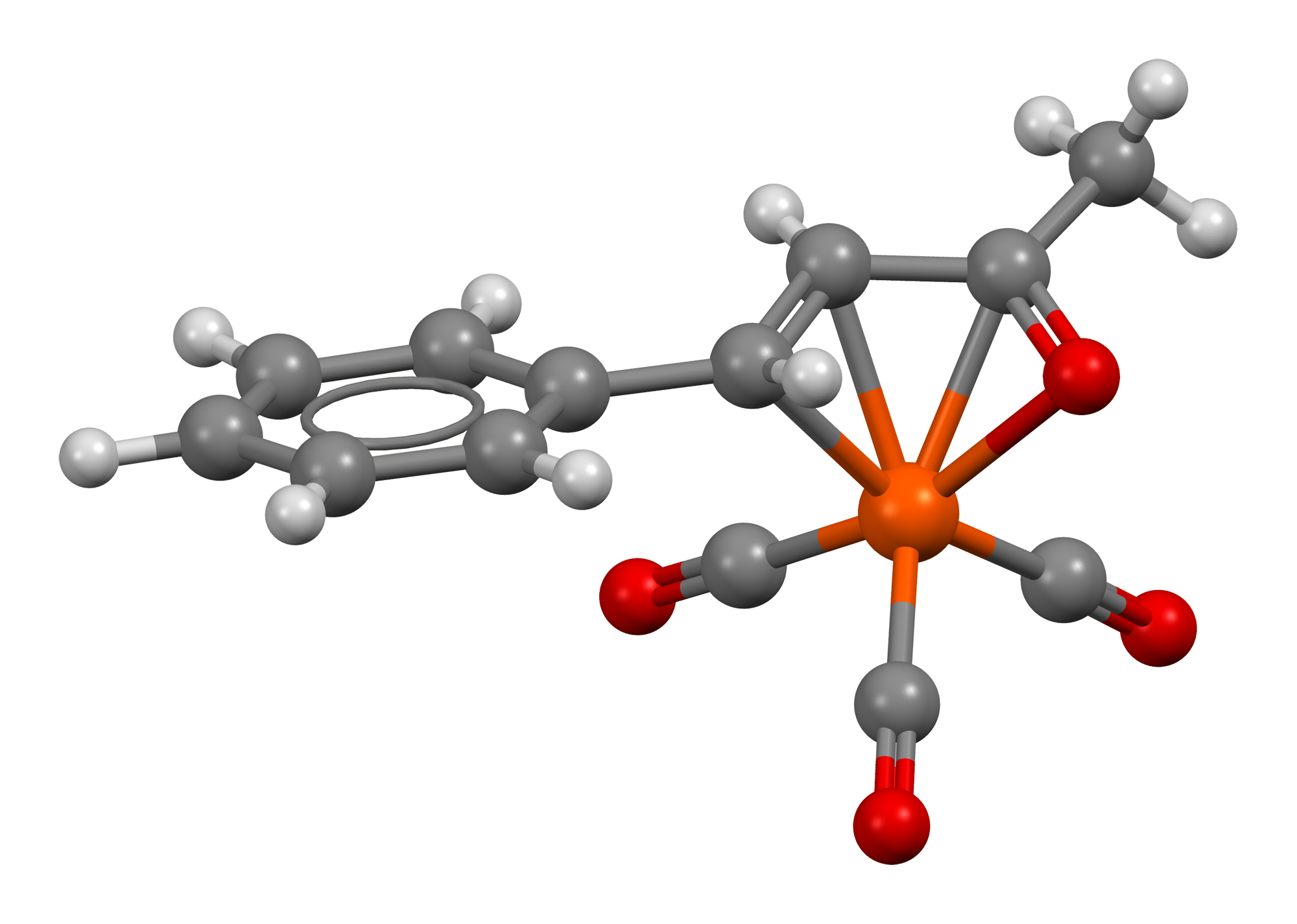

Identifiers
| CAS Number | 38333-35-6 |
| 3D model (JSmol) | Interactive image |
| ChemSpider | 9578311 |
| PubChem CID | 11403415 |
- InChI: InChI=1S/C10H10O.3CO.Fe/c1-9(11)7-8-10-5-3-2-4-6-10;3*1-2;/h2-8H,1H3;;;;/b8-7+;;;; Key: BVYZFTVCCNDAIM-YZNHWISSSA-N
- SMILES: [Fe].[O+]#[C-].[O+]#[C-].[O+]#[C-].O=C(\C=C\c1ccccc1)C

Properties
| Chemical formula | C_{13}H_{10}FeO_{4} |
| Molar mass | 286.060 |
| Appearance | Red solid |
| Melting point | 88 to 89 °C (190 to 192 °F; 361 to 362 K) |
| Solubility in water | slightly soluble |
- Except where otherwise noted, data are given for materials in their standard state (at 25 °C [77 °F], 100 kPa). verify (what is ?) Infobox references

(Benzylideneacetone)iron tricarbonyl is the organoiron compound with the formula (C_{6}H_{5}CH=CHC(O)CH_{3})Fe(CO)_{3}. It is a reagent for transferring the Fe(CO)_{3} unit. This red-colored compound is commonly abbreviated (bda)Fe(CO)_{3}. The complex is air sensitive and should be stored under inert atmosphere.

== Structure and bonding ==
(bda)Fe(CO)_{3} is an example of a complex of an η^{2}-ketone. It is a piano stool complex. The compound is characterized by IR bands at 2065, 2005, and 1985 cm^{−1} (cyclohexane solution), the three bands being indicative of the low symmetry of the complex, which is chiral.

== Synthesis, reactions, related reagents ==
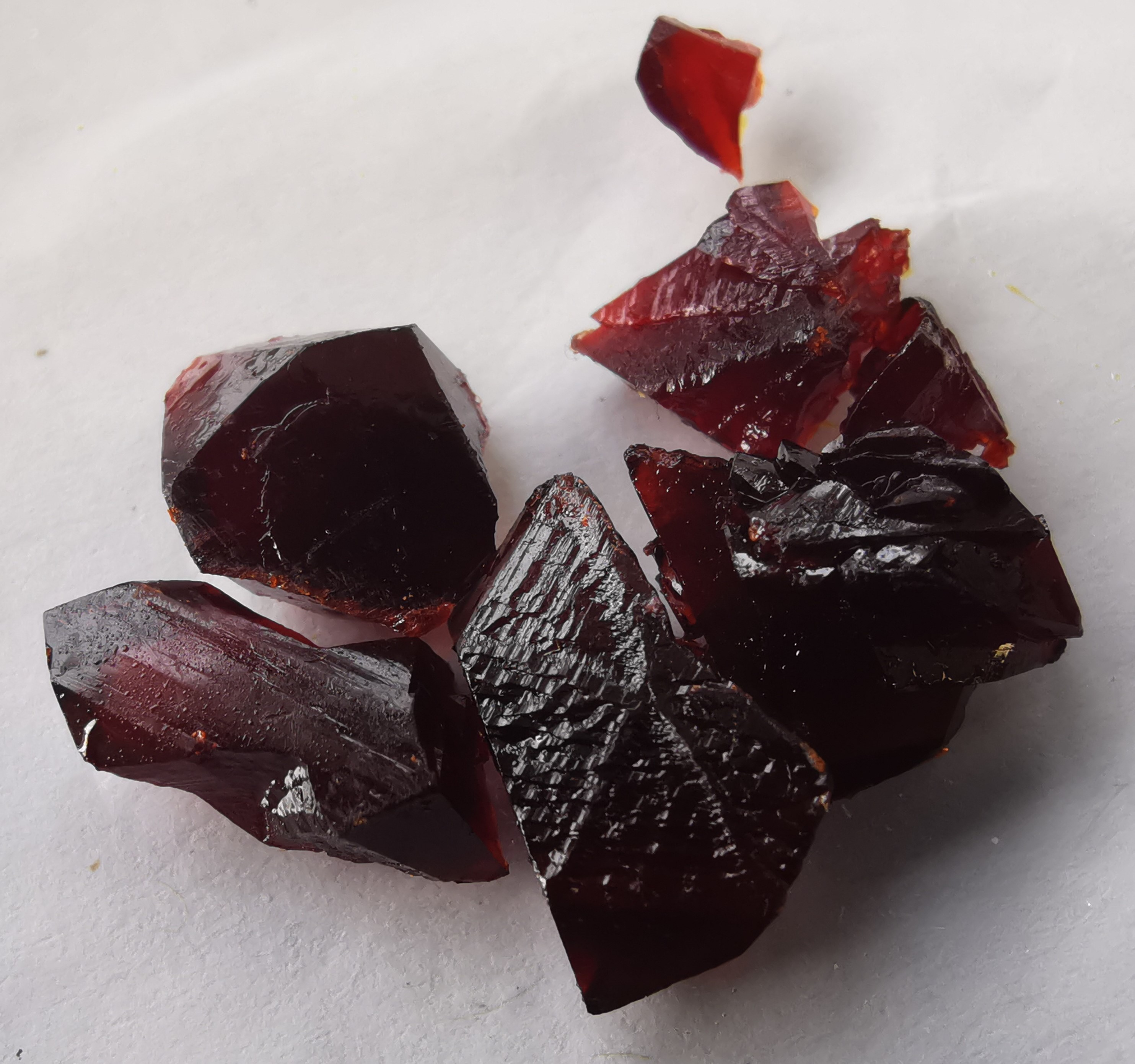
Crystals of (Benzylideneacetone)iron tricarbonyl

It is prepared by the reaction thermal, photochemical or best both, of Fe_{2}(CO)_{9} with benzylideneacetone in diethyl ether for the best yield.

(bda)Fe(CO)_{3} sometimes reacts with Lewis bases to give adducts without displacement of the bda. The reagents of the type (bda)Fe(CO)_{2}(PR_{3}) function as sources of "Fe(CO)_{2}(PR_{3})" (R = aryl, etc.).

Other sources of Fe(CO)_{3} are Fe_{2}(CO)_{9} and Fe(CO)_{3}(cyclooctene)_{2}. The latter is highly reactive and thermally sensitive. Imine derivatives of cinnamaldehyde, e.g. C_{6}H_{5}CH=CHC(H)=NC_{6}H_{5}, also form reactive Fe(CO)_{3} adducts, which have been shown to be superior in some ways to (bda)Fe(CO)_{3}.
