= Hexakis(trimethylphosphine)tungsten =

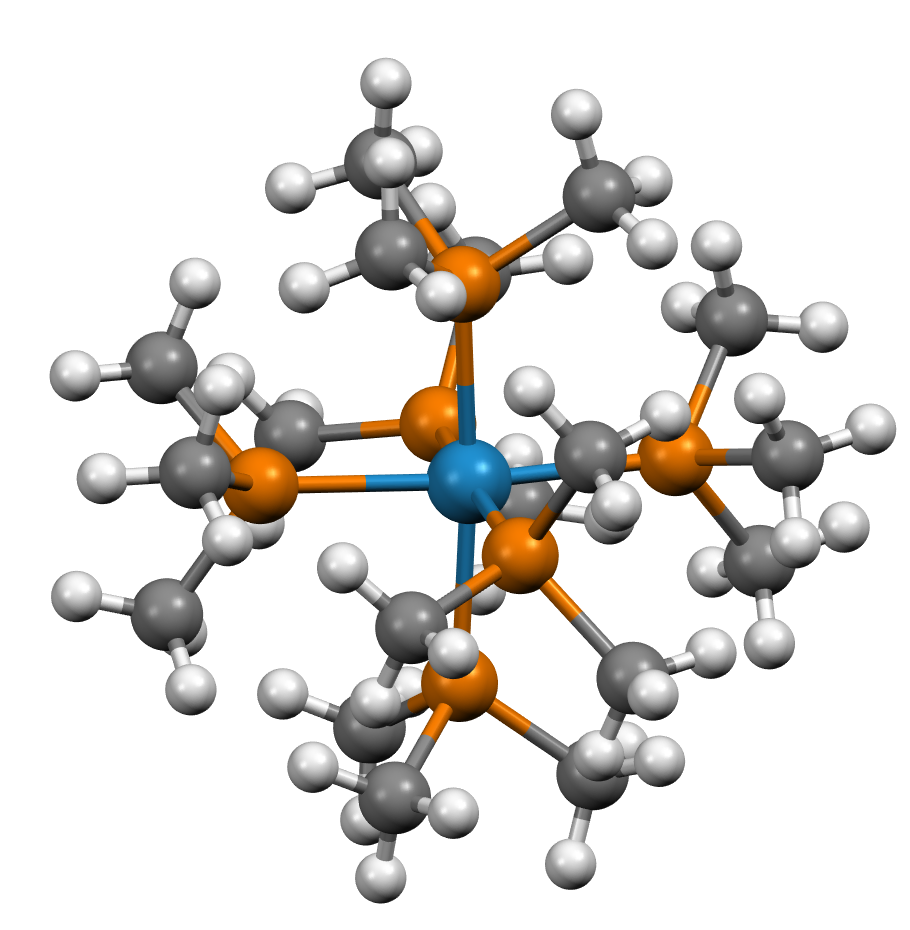

Identifiers
CAS Number	127594-80-3
3D model (JSmol)	Interactive image
ChemSpider	9138493
PubChem CID	10963280
- InChI: InChI=1S/6C3H9P.W/c6*1-4(2)3;/h6*1-3H3; Key: VLOHEZVDOMZCNC-UHFFFAOYSA-N
- SMILES: C[P+](C)(C)[W-6]([P+](C)(C)C)([P+](C)(C)C)([P+](C)(C)C)([P+](C)(C)C)[P+](C)(C)C

Properties
Chemical formula	C_{18}H_{54}P_{6}W
Molar mass	640.31
Appearance	yellow crystalline solid

Structure
Crystal structure	Cubic
Space group	Im3m

Related compounds
Other cations	Mo(PMe_{3})_{6}
- Except where otherwise noted, data are given for materials in their standard state (at 25 °C [77 °F], 100 kPa). Infobox references

Hexakis(trimethylphosphine)tungsten is a tungsten(0) organometallic compound with the formula W(P(CH_{3})_{3})_{6}. It is a yellow crystalline solid, soluble in organic solvents. Much of the most interesting and varied chemistry occurs from its dissociated variants, such as W(PMe_{3})_{5}.

== Synthesis and equilibrium ==
W(PMe_{3})_{6} is a relatively difficult zero-valent, homoleptic trimethylphosphine complex to synthesize and isolate. It equilibrates with PMe_{3} and the metallacycle W(PMe_{3})_{4}(η^{2}-CH_{2}PMe_{2})H:

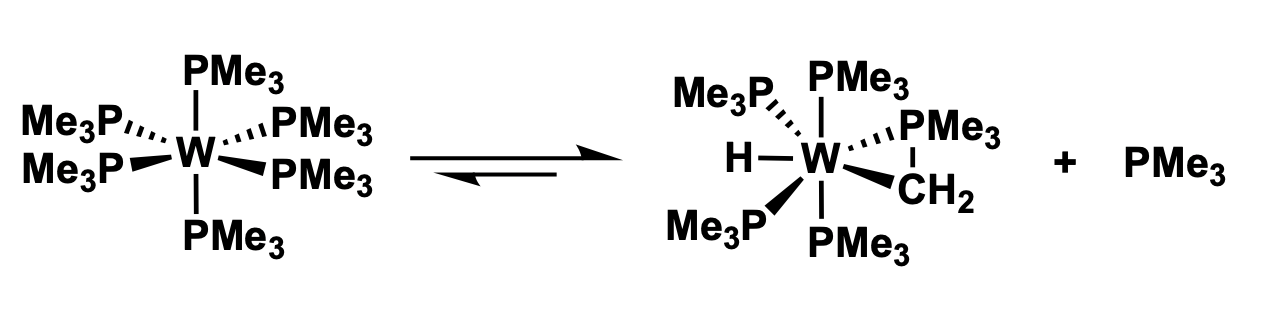
Equilibrium mixture between W(PMe_{3})_{4}(η^{2}-CH_{2}PMe_{2})H and PMe_{3}.

The equilibrium constant at 30 °C is about 17.8 M, and the rightwards reaction has ΔH° = 9.3 kcal/mol (39 kJ/mol) and ΔS° = 37 eu (150 J K^{−1} mol^{−1}). Thus W(PMe_{3})_{6} solutions decompose in about 2 hours, unless the equilibrium is driven to the left by an excess of PMe_{3}.

Naive attempts to prepare W(PMe_{3})_{6} by co-condensation of tungsten with PMe_{3}, or reduction of WCl_{6} with alkali metals, only form W(PMe_{3})_{4}(η^{2}-CH_{2}PMe_{2})H. Parkin and Rabinovich first recognized in 1990 that these attempts, using only stoichiometric PMe_{3} and slow extraction procedures, must necessarily fight the equilibrium. Simple room-temperature reduction with Na-K alloy gives the homoleptic complex when excess PMe_{3} is the solvent:

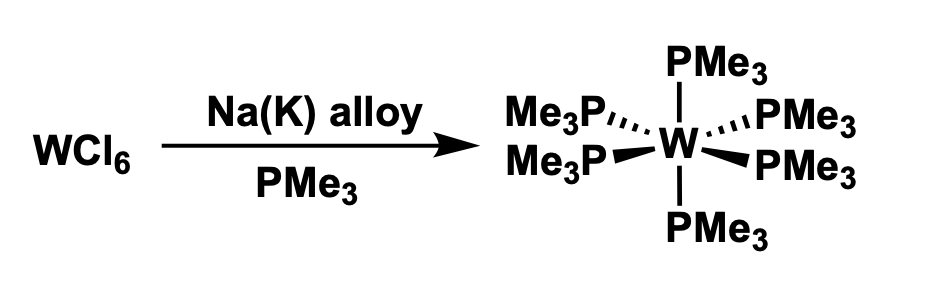
Synthesis of W(PMe_{3})_{6}.

== Crystal properties ==
In the solid state, W(PMe_{3})_{6} is stable at room temperature for at least two weeks. The complex was crystallographically characterized, demonstrating W-P bond lengths of 2.455 ± 0.01 Å (245.5 ± 1.0 pm) and P-W-P bond angles of 90° and 180°.

== Reactivity ==
Metal complexes of the form M(PMe_{3})_{n} contain very electron-rich and highly-reactive metal centers as a result of the combination of the strong σ-donating and π-accepting nature of the PMe_{3} ligand. These complexes have been shown to be capable of activating C-H and other otherwise unreactive σ bonds via oxidative addition, often forming cyclometalated products.

W(PMe_{3})_{6} possesses an 18-electron valence count, and as such demonstrates somewhat limited reactivity.

=== Diphosphene metathesis ===
W(PMe_{3})_{6} can catalyze the metathesis of phosphorus-phosphorus double-bonds. Interaction of the appropriate dichlorophosphane with W(PMe_{3})_{6} leads to dechlorination and formation of symmetrical and unsymmetrical diphosphenes:

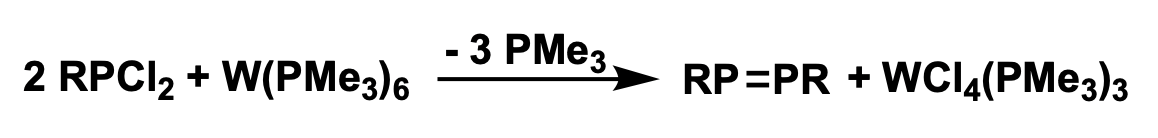

The resultant phosphorus-tungsten species can also catalyze the exchange of diphosphene end-groups.

=== Metal-germanium triple bonds ===
The W(PMe_{3})_{4}(η^{2}-CH_{2}PMe_{2})H species formed upon the dissolution of W(PMe_{3})_{6} can participate in a Ge-Cl bond heterolysis and form a metal-germanium triple bond:

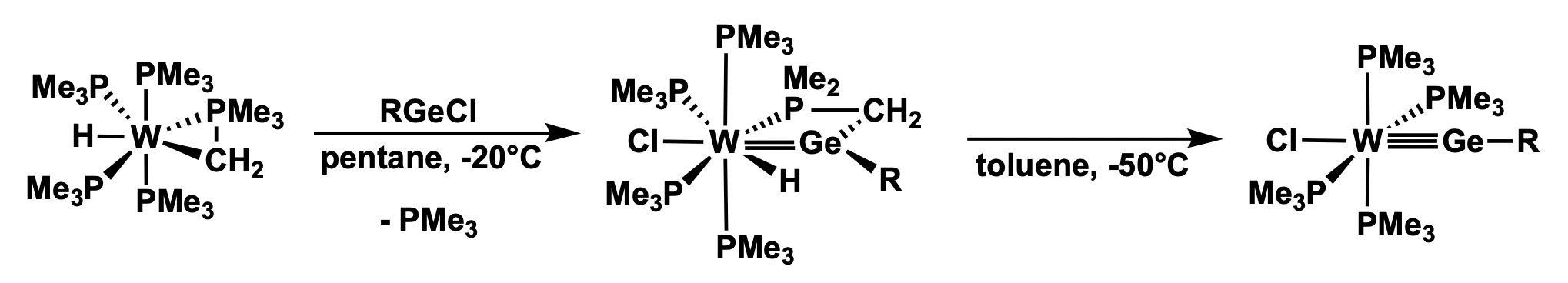
