= Transition metal complexes of aldehydes and ketones =

Chemical compound containing transition metals and aldehydes or ketones

Structure of an η^{2}-formaldehyde complex.

Transition metal complexes of aldehydes and ketones describes coordination complexes with aldehyde (RCHO) and ketone (R_{2}CO) ligands. Because aldehydes and ketones are common, the area is of fundamental interest. Some reactions that are useful in organic chemistry involve such complexes.

== Structure and bonding ==
Structure of [ZnBr_{3}(η^{1}-acetone)]^{−}.

In monometallic complexes, aldehydes and ketones can bind to metals in either of two modes, η^{1}-O-bonded and η^{2}-C,O-bonded. These bonding modes are sometimes referred to sigma- and pi-bonded. These forms may sometimes interconvert.

The sigma bonding mode is more common for higher valence, Lewis-acidic metal centers (e.g., Zn^{2+}). The pi-bonded mode is observed for low valence, electron-rich metal centers (e.g., Fe(0) and Os(0)).

For the purpose of electron-counting, O-bonded ligands count as 2-electron "L ligands": they are Lewis bases. η^{2}-C,O ligands are described as analogues of alkene ligands, i.e. the Dewar-Chatt-Duncanson model.

η^{2}-C,O ketones and aldehydes can function as bridging ligands, utilizing a lone pair of electrons on oxygen. One such complex is [(C_{5}H_{5})_{2}Zr(CH_{2}O)]_{3}, which features a Zr_{3}O_{3} ring.

== Formaldehyde complexes ==
Formaldehyde, being the simplest organic carbonyl and being an important industrial chemical, holds a special position as a ligand. Commonly it binds as η^{2}-CH_{2}O, i.e. "side-on bonded", comparable to ethylene. The first example was Os(η^{2}-CH_{2}O)(CO)_{2}(PPh_{3})_{2} (Ph = phenyl, C_{6}H_{5}). By virtue of the lone pairs of electrons on oxygen, M(η^{2}-CH_{2}O) entity can bridge to other metals.

Complexes are also known for vanadium, rhenium, zirconium (Zr), ruthenium (Ru), and niobium (Nb).

=== Synthesis ===
Usually formaldehyde complexes are prepared by treating low-valence metal complexes with formaldehyde or one of its oligomers such as paraformaldehyde:

Os(CO)_{2}(PPh_{3})_{3} + CH_{2}O → Os(η^{2}-CH_{2}O)(CO)_{2}(PPh_{3})_{2} + PPh_{3}

More exotic routes have been demonstrated such as the addition of CO to metal hydride complexes. Such reactions are proposed to resemble steps in Fischer-Tropsch hydrogenation of CO.

The complex W(PMe_{3})_{4}(η^{2}-CH_{2}O)H_{2}results from the addition of methanol to W(PMe_{3})_{4}(η^{2}-CH_{2}PMe_{2})H.

Compounds in which metals replace the aldehydic hydrogen, instead of enolizing the carbonyl, are transition metal acyl complexes.

== Reactions ==
The reactivity of metal-formaldehyde complexes has been well investigated. W(PMe_{3})_{4}(η^{2}-CH_{2}O)H_{2} can be hydrogenated to give W(PMe_{3})_{4}(CH_{3}O)H_{3} and then methanol to generate W(PMe_{3})_{4}H_{4}.

In some cases, alkenes can inert into the M-C bond of the M(η^{2}-CH_{2}O) entity.

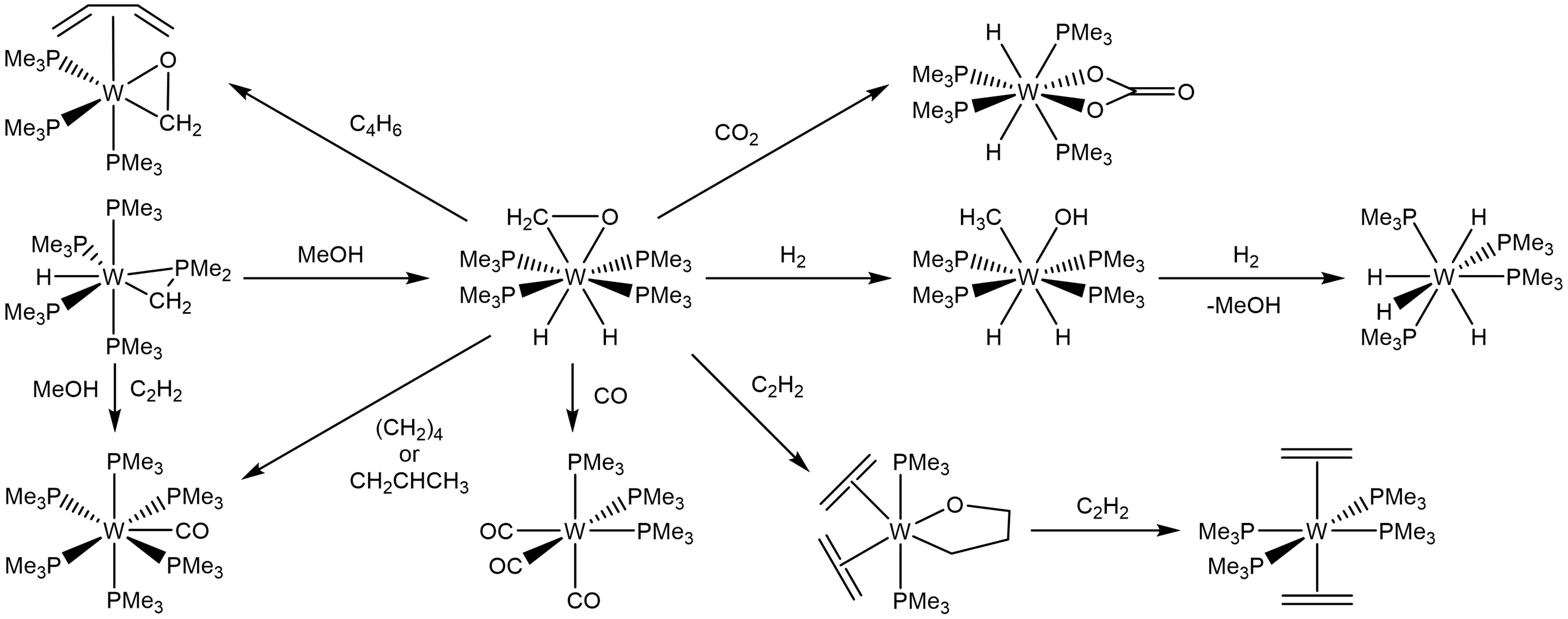
Reported reactions of W(PMe_{3})_{4}(η^{2}-CH_{2}O)H_{2}.

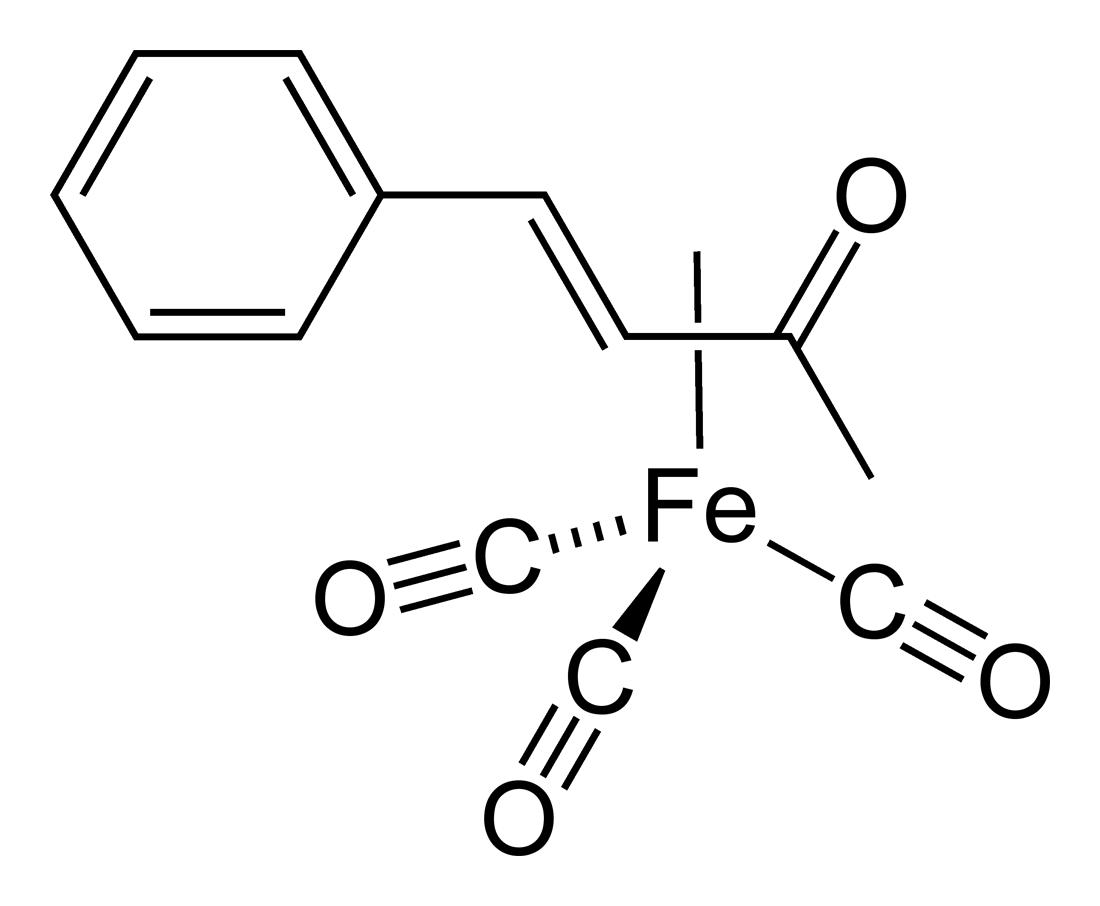
(Benzylideneacetone)iron tricarbonyl is an organoiron compound with an η^{2} ketone ligand.

Some η^{2}-aldehyde complexes insert alkenes to give five-membered metallacycles.

η^{1}-Complexes of alpha-beta unsaturated carbonyls exhibit enhanced reactivity toward dienes. This interaction is the basis of Lewis-acid catalyzed Diels-Alder reactions.

The hydroformylation of formaldehyde gives glycolaldehyde:

CH_{2}O + H_{2} + CO → HOCH_{2}CHO
