= Phosphine telluride =

Structure of a tertiary phosphine telluride.

A phosphine telluride refers to organophosphorus compounds with the formula R_{3}PTe (R = alkyl or aryl). They are structurally analogous to phosphine oxides, phosphine sulfides, and phosphine selenides. Unlike other members of this series, the phosphine tellurides are labile with respect to loss of the chalcogen. Aryl-substituted phosphine telluridew tend to lose tellurium easier. Nonetheless, several members have been characterized by X-ray crystallography, which reveals a tetrahedral phosphorus center with a P-Te bond length of 236 picometers. Simple trialkylphosphine tellurides are pale yellow solids.

Phosphine tellurides like trioctylphoshine telluride, tributylphosphine telluride and tricyclohexylphosphine telluride are reagents used in the preparation of metal telluride nanoparticles.
