= Metal vapor synthesis =

Chemical synthetic technique

In chemistry, metal vapor synthesis (MVS) is a method for preparing metal complexes by combining freshly produced metal atoms or small particles with ligands. In contrast to the high reactivity of such freshly produced metal atoms, bulk metals typically are unreactive toward neutral ligands. The method has been used to prepare compounds that cannot be prepared by traditional synthetic methods, e.g. Ti(η^{6}-toluene)_{2}. The technique relies on a reactor that evaporates the metal, allowing the vapor to impinge on a cold reactor wall that is coated with the organic ligand. The metal evaporates upon being heated resistively or irradiated with an electron beam. The apparatus operates under high vacuum. In a common implementation, the metal vapor and the organic ligand are co-condensed at liquid nitrogen temperatures.

In several case where compounds are prepared by MVS, related preparations employ conventional routes. Thus, tris(butadiene)molybdenum was first prepared by co-condensation of butadiene and Mo vapor, but yields are higher for the reduction of molybdenum(V) chloride in the presence of the diene.
