= Air sensitivity =

Air sensitivity is a term used, particularly in chemistry, to denote the reactivity of chemical compounds with some constituent of air. Most often, reactions occur with atmospheric oxygen (O_{2}) or water vapor (H_{2}O), although reactions with the other constituents of air such as carbon monoxide (CO), carbon dioxide (CO_{2}), and nitrogen (N_{2}) are also possible.

== Method ==
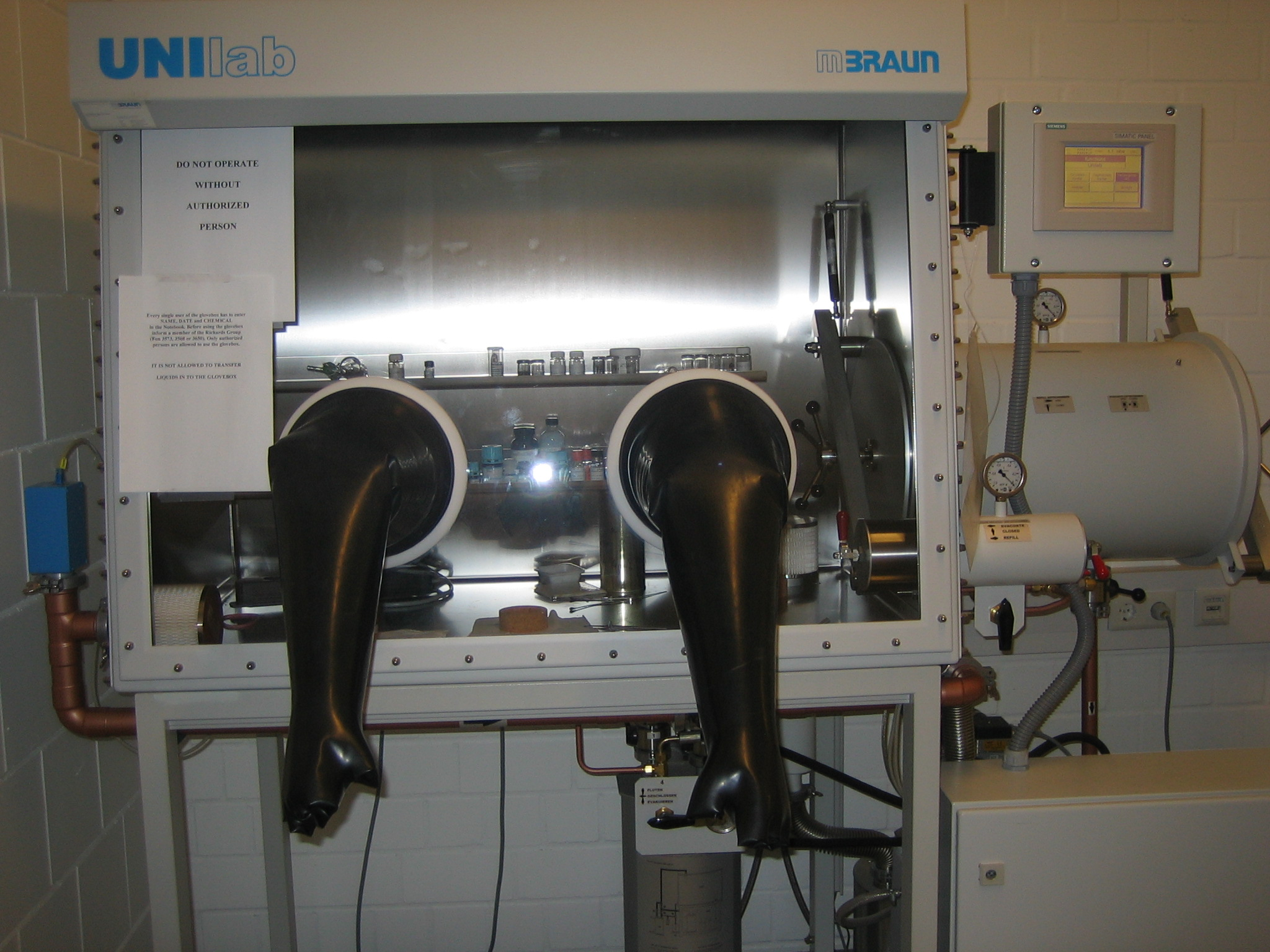
Glovebox

A variety of air-free techniques have been developed to handle air-sensitive compounds. Two main types of equipment are gloveboxes and Schlenk lines. Glove boxes are sealed cabinets filled with an inert gas such as argon or nitrogen. Normal laboratory equipment can be set up in the glovebox, and manipulated by the use of gloves that penetrate its walls. The atmosphere can be regulated to approximately atmospheric pressure and set to be pure nitrogen or other gas with which the chemicals will not react. Chemicals and equipment can be transferred in and out via an airlock.

A Schlenk line is a vacuum and inert-gas dual-manifold that allows glassware to be evacuated and refilled with inert gas specially developed to work with air sensitive compounds. It is connected with a cold trap to prevent vapors from contaminating a rotary vane pump. The technique is modified from the double-tipped needle technique. These methods allow working in totally controlled and isolated environment.

== Air-sensitive compounds ==
Air-sensitive compounds are substances that would react with components in air. Almost all metals react with air to form a thin passivating layer of oxide, which is often imperceptible.

Many bulk compounds react readily with air as well. The reactive components of air are O_{2}, H_{2}O, CO_{2}, and sometimes N_{2}. Very many compounds react with some or all of these species. Examples:

- O_{2}: organolithium compounds and Grignard reagents
- H_{2}O: anhydrous metal halides and acyl chlorides as well as organolithium compounds and Grignard reagents
- CO_{2}: strong bases such as sodium hydroxide, as well as organolithium compounds and Grignard reagents
- N_{2}: lithium metal (but not organolithium compounds)

Some semiconductors are air-sensitive.

== See also ==
- Hygroscopy
- Hydrophile
- Ultrahydrophobicity
