= Koshkonong =

Koshkonong may refer to:

== Places ==
United States

- Koshkonong, Missouri
- Koshkonong (community), Wisconsin, an unincorporated community
- Koshkonong Manor, Wisconsin, an unincorporated community
- Koshkonong Mounds, Wisconsin, an unincorporated community
- Koshkonong, Wisconsin, a town
- Fort Koshkonong, a historical location in Wisconsin
- Lake Koshkonong, Wisconsin, a census-designated place
- Lake Koshkonong, a reservoir in southern Wisconsin
