= Watertown Municipal Airport =

Watertown Municipal Airport may refer to:

- Watertown Municipal Airport (Wisconsin) in Watertown, Wisconsin, United States (FAA: RYV)
- Watertown Regional Airport (formerly Watertown Municipal) in Watertown, South Dakota, United States (FAA: ATY)

== See also ==
- Watertown Airport (disambiguation)
