= Albert and Mary Shekey House =

Historic house in Wisconsin, United States

- U.S. National Register of Historic Places
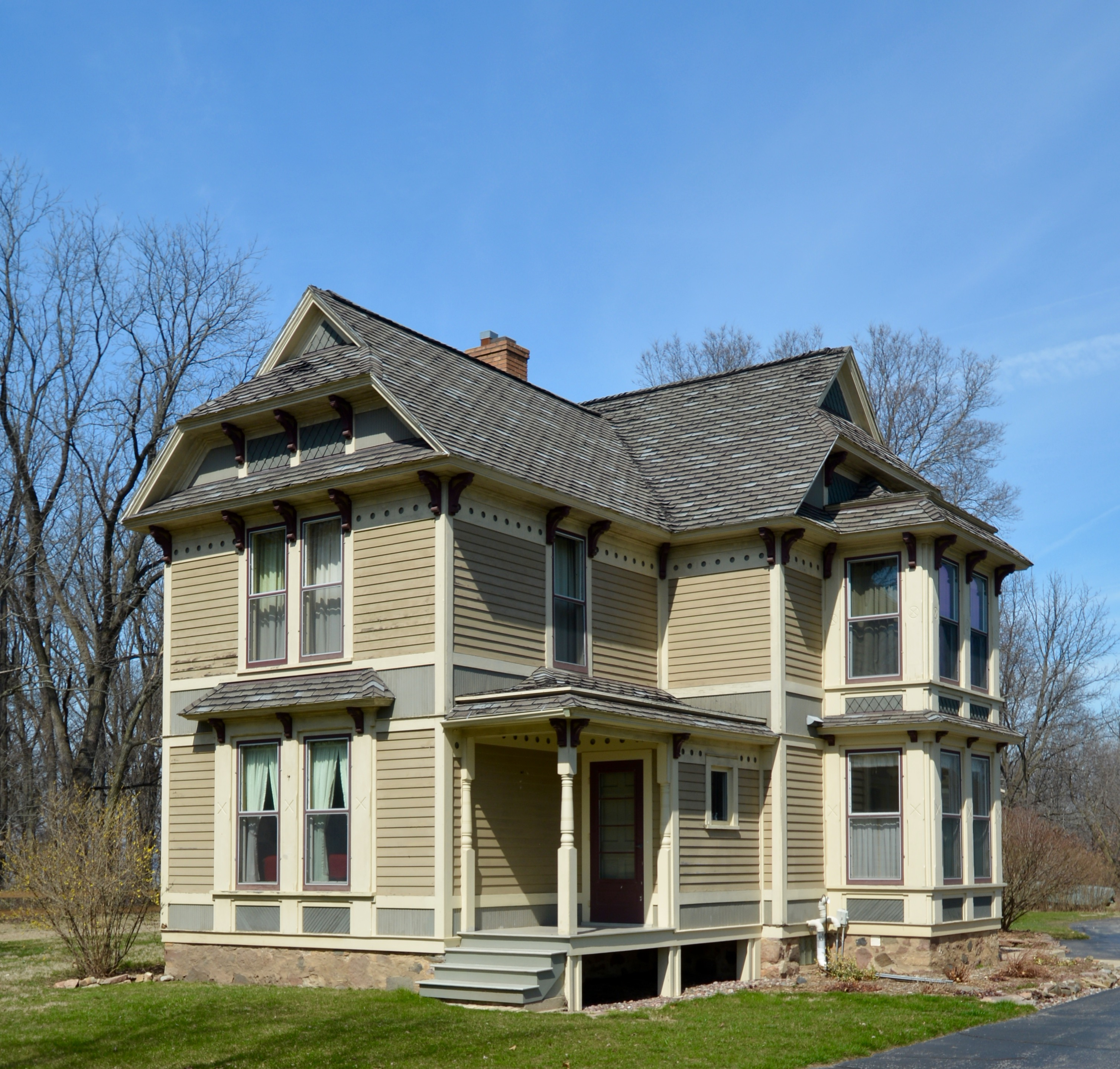
- Albert and Mary Shekey House

- Location within Wisconsin
- Location: W7526 Koshkonong Mounds Rd. Koshkonong, Wisconsin
- Coordinates: 42°52′33″N 88°54′21″W
- Built: 1885
- Architectural style: Queen Anne
- NRHP reference No.: 15000404
- Added to NRHP: July 7, 2015

The Albert and Mary Shekey House is a historic house at W7526 Koshkonong Mounds Road in the town of Koshkonong, Wisconsin. The house was built in 1885 for Mary Shekey, the daughter of two of Jefferson County's first settlers, and her husband Albert, an engineer for the Chicago & North Western Railway. It provided close access to Lake Koshkonong and the Koshkonong Place hunting lodge; it is unknown if the Shekeys, who were Janesville residents before the house was built, lived in the house full-time or used it as a summer or rental home. The house has a Queen Anne design, a popular style of the late nineteenth century, though its architect and builder are unknown. Its design includes a projecting bay on the east side, an irregular cruciform roof with several hips and gables, ornamental brackets and a frieze board with carved circles below the eaves, and Dutch gables with wooden shingles within the gable ends.

The house was added to the State Register of Historic Places in 2014 and to the National Register of Historic Places the following year.
