= UPIITA =

School of the National Polytechnic Institute in Mexico

Interdisciplinary Professional Unit in Engineering and Advanced Technologies
- Unidad Profesional Interdisciplinaria en Ingeniería y Tecnologías Avanzadas
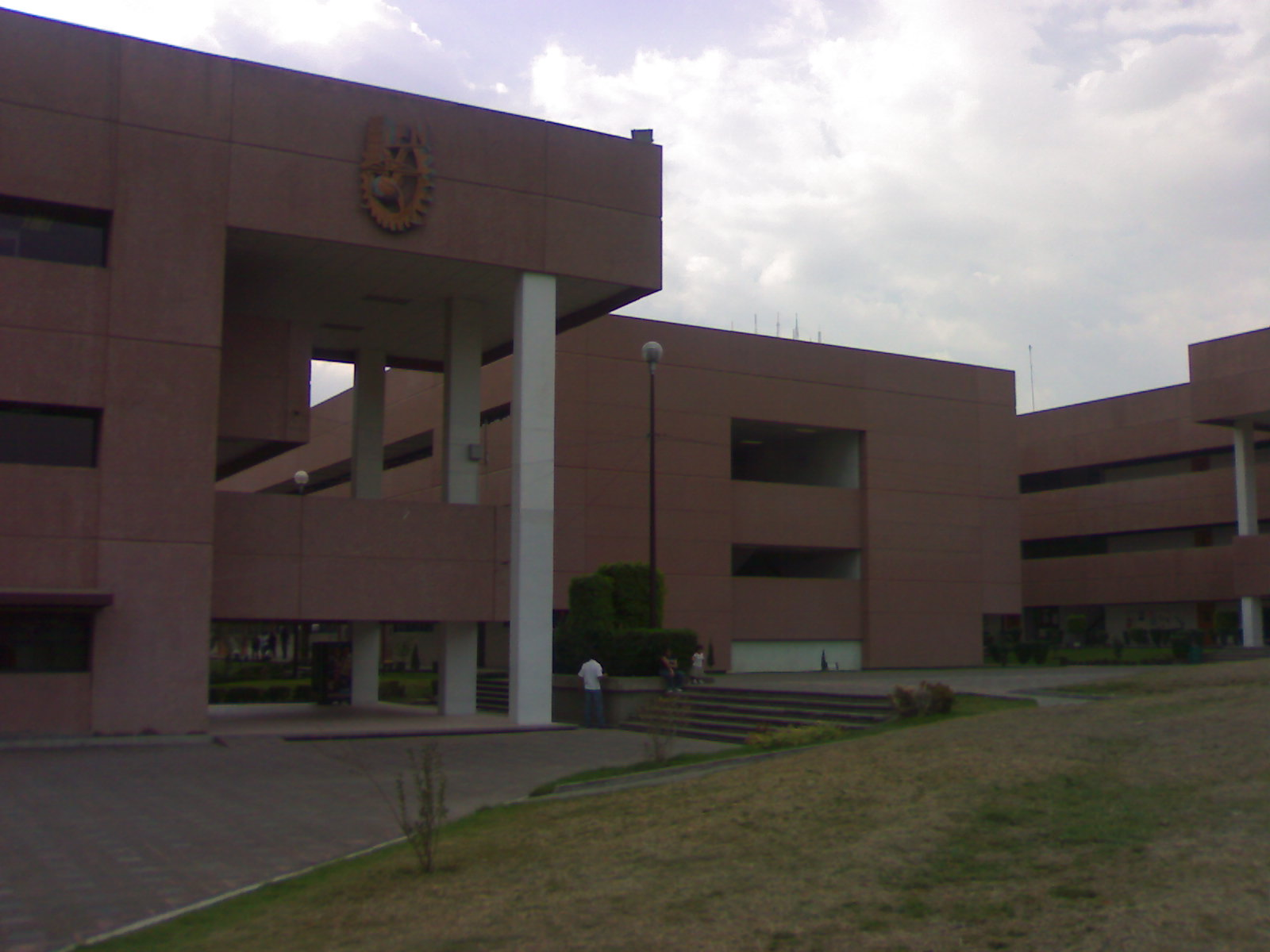
- Entrance to UPIITA
- Type: Public
- Established: 16 July 1997
- Parent institution: National Polytechnic Institute
- Affiliations: ANFEI
- Dean: Gerardo Alejandro Valentino Orozco
- Director: Ramón Herrera Ávila
- Location: Mexico City, Mexico; 19°30′40″N 99°07′32″W
- Nickname: UPIITA
- Website: https://www.upiita.ipn.mx

The Interdisciplinary Professional Unit in Engineering and Advanced Technologies (in Spanish: Unidad Profesional Interdisciplinaria en Ingeniería y Tecnologías Avanzadas or UPIITA) is one of the schools of the National Polytechnic Institute, located in Mexico City, Mexico. It offers undergraduate studies in Bionics, Telematics, Mechatronics, and Energy engineering, as well as postgraduate programs in Advanced Technology.

UPIITA is currently one of the most demanded engineering schools in Mexico. Thousands of students apply each year through an admission test, but only a few hundred (around 300) are accepted. It stands as one of the best and most demanding engineering schools in the country, where many teachers work in scientific research.

Originally, UPIITA was meant to hold a larger number of students, but since the 75% of students quit before the 3rd semester, most classrooms were turned into technology labs.
