= Watertown (town), Wisconsin =

Watertown, Wisconsin
- Town
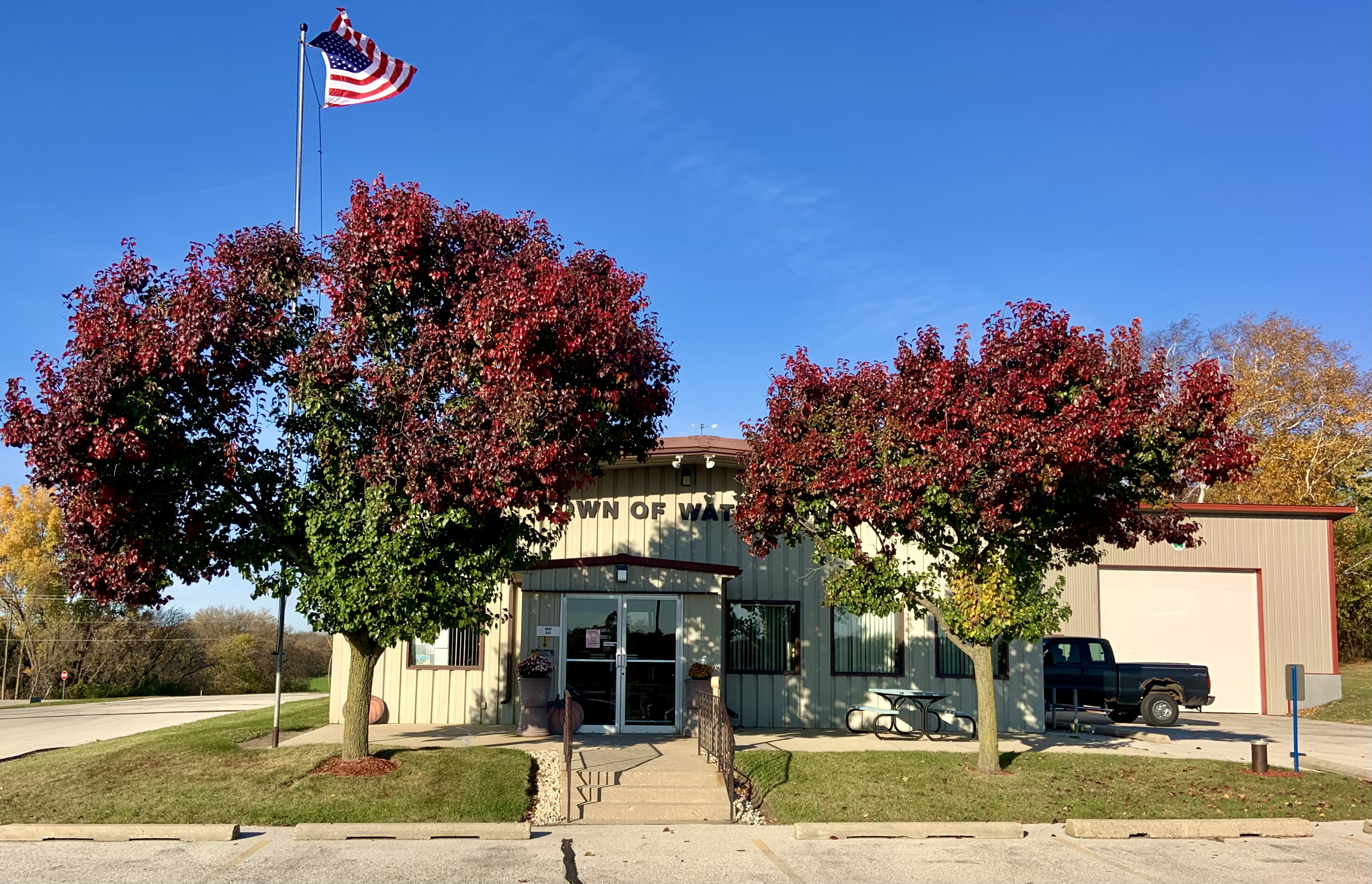
- Watertown Town Hall

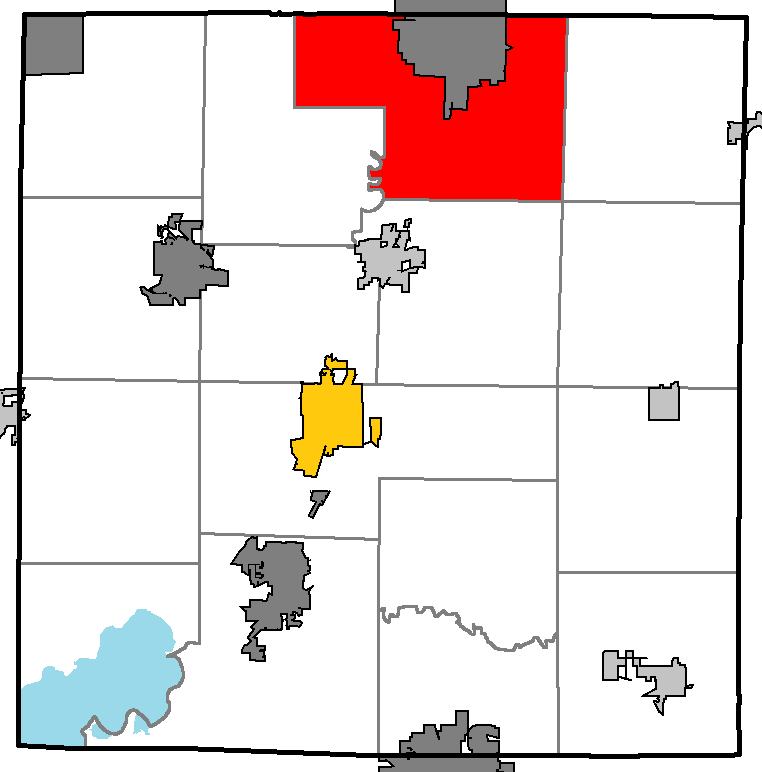
- Location of Watertown, within Jefferson County, Wisconsin

- Location within the state of Wisconsin
- Coordinates: 43°11′35″N 88°43′26″W
- Country: United States
- State: Wisconsin
- County: Jefferson

Area
  - Total: 37.9 sq mi (98.1 km^{2})
  - Land: 37.5 sq mi (97.0 km^{2})
  - Water: 0.46 sq mi (1.2 km^{2})
- Elevation: 840 ft (260 m)

Population (2020)
  - Total: 1,933
  - Density: 51.6/sq mi (19.9/km^{2})
- Time zone: UTC-6 (Central (CST))
  - Summer (DST): UTC-5 (CDT)
- Area code: 920
- GNIS feature ID: 1584366
- Website: townofwatertownwi.gov

Watertown is a town in Jefferson County, Wisconsin, United States. The population was 1,933 at the 2020 census. The unincorporated community of Ebenezer is located in the town.

== Geography ==
Watertown is located at 43°11′35″N 88°43′25″W (43.193066, −88.723774).

According to the United States Census Bureau, the town has a total area of 37.9 square miles (98.1 km^{2}), of which 37.5 square miles (97.0 km^{2}) is land and 0.46 square miles (1.2 km^{2}), or 1.17%, is water.

== Demographics ==
As of the census of 2000, there were 1,876 people, 684 households, and 547 families residing in the town. The population density was 48.9 people per square mile (18.9/km^{2}). There were 715 housing units at an average density of 18.6/sq mi (7.2/km^{2}). The racial makeup of the town was 98.40% White, 0.27% African American, 0.11% Native American, 0.43% Asian, 0.48% from other races, and 0.32% from two or more races. Hispanic or Latino of any race were 1.33% of the population.

There were 684 households, out of which 33.2% had children under the age of 18 living with them, 70.9% were married couples living together, 5.0% had a female householder with no husband present, and 19.9% were non-families. 15.8% of all households were made up of individuals, and 6.9% had someone living alone who was 65 years of age or older. The average household size was 2.72 and the average family size was 3.03.

In the town, the population was spread out, with 24.8% under the age of 18, 7.7% from 18 to 24, 27.1% from 25 to 44, 29.2% from 45 to 64, and 11.1% who were 65 years of age or older. The median age was 39 years. For every 100 females, there were 105.0 males. For every 100 females age 18 and over, there were 109.0 males.

The median income for a household in the town was $52,667, and the median income for a family was $55,150. Males had a median income of $39,177 versus $25,027 for females. The per capita income for the town was $21,298. About 1.9% of families and 3.0% of the population were below the poverty line, including 1.2% of those under age 18 and 6.5% of those age 65 or over.
