= Lake Koshkonong, Wisconsin =

Census-designated place in Wisconsin, United States

- Census-designated place
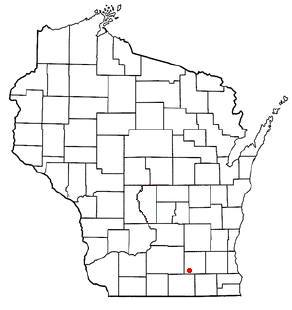
- Location of Lake Koshkonong, Wisconsin
- Coordinates: 42°51′38″N 88°56′25″W
- Country: United States
- State: Wisconsin
- County: Jefferson
- Town: Koshkonong, Sumner

Area
  - Total: 29.9 sq mi (77.4 km^{2})
  - Land: 14.3 sq mi (37.1 km^{2})
  - Water: 15.6 sq mi (40.3 km^{2})
- Elevation: 781 ft (238 m)

Population (2020)
  - Total: 1,239
  - Density: 86.5/sq mi (33.4/km^{2})
- Time zone: UTC-6 (Central (CST))
  - Summer (DST): UTC-5 (CDT)
- FIPS code: 55-41583
- GNIS feature ID: 1852244

Lake Koshkonong is a census-designated place (CDP) in the towns of Koshkonong and Sumner, Jefferson County, Wisconsin, United States. The population was 1,239 at the 2020 census. Lake Koshkonong is in the area.

== Geography ==
Lake Koshkonong is located at 42°51′38″N 88°56′25″W (42.860475, -88.940344).

According to the United States Census Bureau, the CDP has a total area of 29.9 square miles (77.4 km^{2}), of which 14.3 square miles (37.1 km^{2}) is land and 15.6 square miles (40.3 km^{2}) (52.11%) is water.

== Demographics ==
Historical population
Census	Pop.	Note	%±
2000	1,219		—
2010	1,204		−1.2%
2020	1,239		2.9%
U.S. Decennial Census

As of the census of 2000, there were 1,219 people, 492 households, and 338 families residing in the CDP. The population density was 85.2 people per square mile (32.9/km^{2}). There were 809 housing units at an average density of 56.6/sq mi (21.8/km^{2}). The racial makeup of the CDP was 98.36% White, 0.25% Native American, 0.16% Asian, 0.16% from other races, and 1.07% from two or more races. Hispanic or Latino of any race were 1.39% of the population.

There were 492 households, out of which 25.4% had children under the age of 18 living with them, 59.8% were married couples living together, 4.7% had a female householder with no husband present, and 31.1% were non-families. 22.6% of all households were made up of individuals, and 9.8% had someone living alone who was 65 years of age or older. The average household size was 2.48 and the average family size was 2.88.

In the CDP, the population was spread out, with 21.2% under the age of 18, 6.2% from 18 to 24, 26.4% from 25 to 44, 32.1% from 45 to 64, and 14.0% who were 65 years of age or older. The median age was 42 years. For every 100 females, there were 108.0 males. For every 100 females age 18 and over, there were 106.9 males.

The median income for a household in the CDP was $54,412, and the median income for a family was $60,761. Males had a median income of $36,181 versus $25,337 for females. The per capita income for the CDP was $23,801. About 2.9% of families and 5.1% of the population were below the poverty line, including 4.7% of those under age 18 and 2.5% of those age 65 or over.
