= Milton, Rock County, Wisconsin =

Town of Milton, Wisconsin
- Town
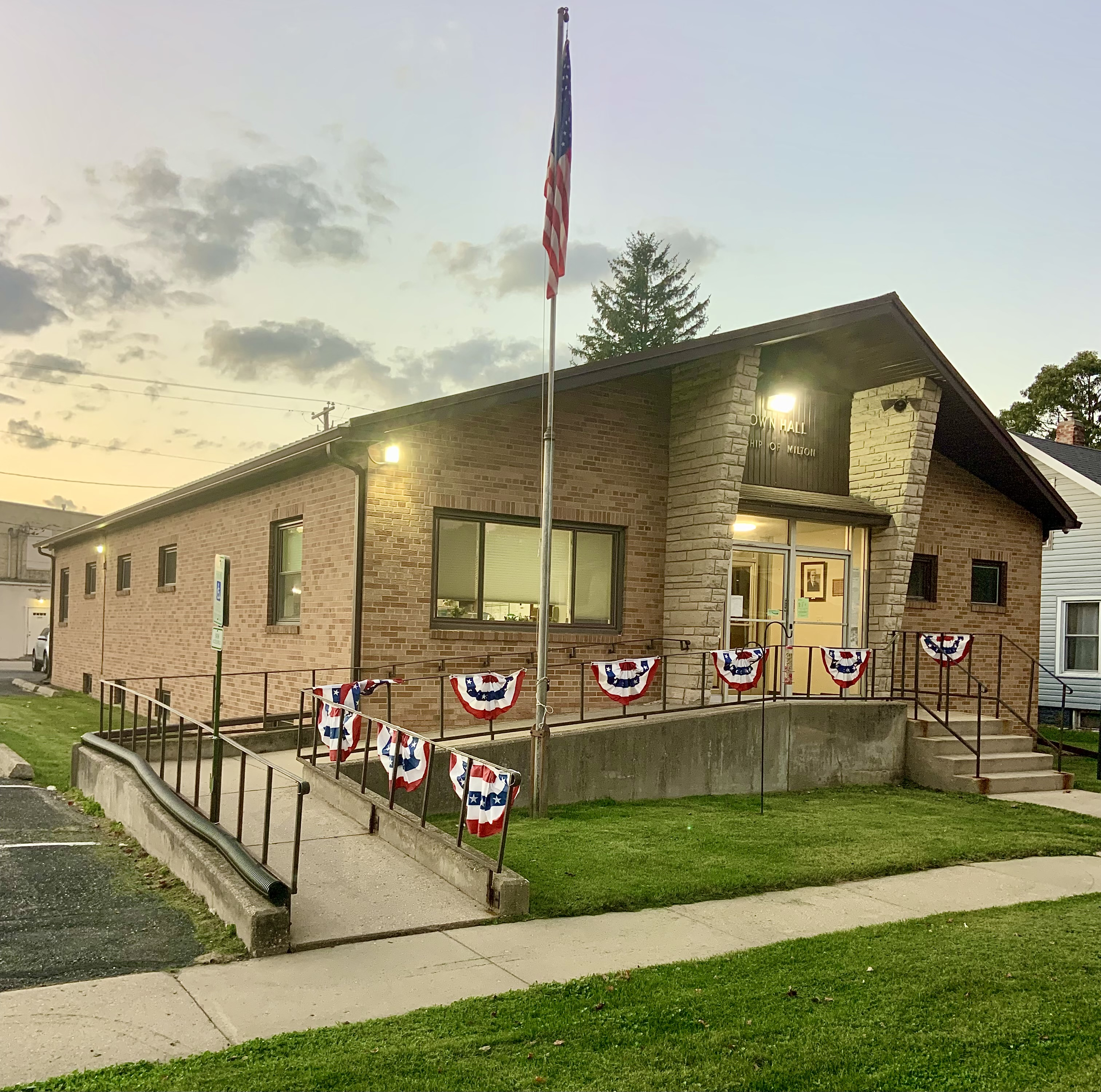
- Town hall

- Location in Rock County and the state of Wisconsin.
- Coordinates: 42°48′49″N 88°58′47″W
- Country: United States
- State: Wisconsin
- County: Rock

Area
  - Total: 33.0 sq mi (85.5 km^{2})
  - Land: 31.4 sq mi (81.2 km^{2})
  - Water: 1.7 sq mi (4.3 km^{2})
- Elevation: 879 ft (268 m)

Population (2020)
  - Total: 3,100
  - Density: 91/sq mi (35/km^{2})
- Time zone: UTC-6 (Central (CST))
  - Summer (DST): UTC-5 (CDT)
- Area code: 608
- FIPS code: 55-52225
- GNIS feature ID: 1583723
- Website: http://townofmiltonrc.com/

Milton is a town in Rock County, Wisconsin, United States. The population was 3,100 at the 2020 census. The City of Milton is within the town, although it is politically independent. The unincorporated communities of Charlie Bluff, Coopers Shores, Mallwood, and Maple Beach are located in the town. The unincorporated communities of Koshkonong and Newville are also partially in the town.

== History ==
The town of Milton was named for John Milton, an English poet.

== Geography ==
According to the United States Census Bureau, the town has a total area of 33.0 square miles (85.5 km^{2}), of which 31.3 square miles (81.2 km^{2}) is land and 1.6 square miles (4.3 km^{2}) (5.00%) is water.

== Demographics ==
At the 2000 census, there were 2,844 people, 1,061 households and 812 families residing in the town. The population density was 90.7 people per square mile (35.0/km^{2}). There were 1,277 housing units at an average density of 40.7 per square mile (15.7/km^{2}). The racial makeup of the town was 98.07% White, 0.18% Black or African American, 0.18% Native American, 0.32% Asian, 0.42% from other races, and 0.84% from two or more races. 1.16% of the population were Hispanic or Latino of any race.

There were 1,061 households, of which 33.8% had children under the age of 18 living with them, 65.8% were married couples living together, 6.3% had a female householder with no husband present, and 23.4% were non-families. 17.7% of all households were made up of individuals, and 6.9% had someone living alone who was 65 years of age or older. The average household size was 2.67 and the average family size was 3.04.

Age distribution was 26.3% under the age of 18, 7.1% from 18 to 24, 29.8% from 25 to 44, 28.0% from 45 to 64, and 8.8% who were 65 years of age or older. The median age was 38 years. For every 100 females, there were 104.8 males. For every 100 females age 18 and over, there were 108.8 males.

The median household income was $60,151, and the median family income was $64,536. Males had a median income of $46,654 versus $26,742 for females. The per capita income for the town was $21,982. About 2.7% of families and 3.6% of the population were below the poverty line, including 3.3% of those under age 18 and 4.0% of those age 65 or over.
