= Ebenezer, Wisconsin =

- Unincorporated community
- Location within Wisconsin Location within the United States
- Coordinates: 43°08′18″N 88°44′16″W
- Country: United States
- State: Wisconsin
- County: Jefferson
- Town: Watertown
- Elevation: 856 ft (261 m)
- Time zone: UTC-6 (Central (CST))
  - Summer (DST): UTC-5 (CDT)
- Area code: 920
- GNIS feature ID: 1577585

Ebenezer is an unincorporated community located in the town of Watertown, in Jefferson County, Wisconsin, United States.

== Notable person ==
- Edwin E. Witte, educator and economist
