= Watertown Airport =

Watertown Airport may refer to:

- Watertown International Airport in Watertown, New York, United States (FAA: ART)
- Watertown Regional Airport (formerly Watertown Municipal) in Watertown, South Dakota, United States (FAA: ATY)
- Watertown Municipal Airport (Wisconsin) in Watertown, Wisconsin, United States (FAA: RYV)
