= Vinnie Ha Ha, Wisconsin =

- Unincorporated community
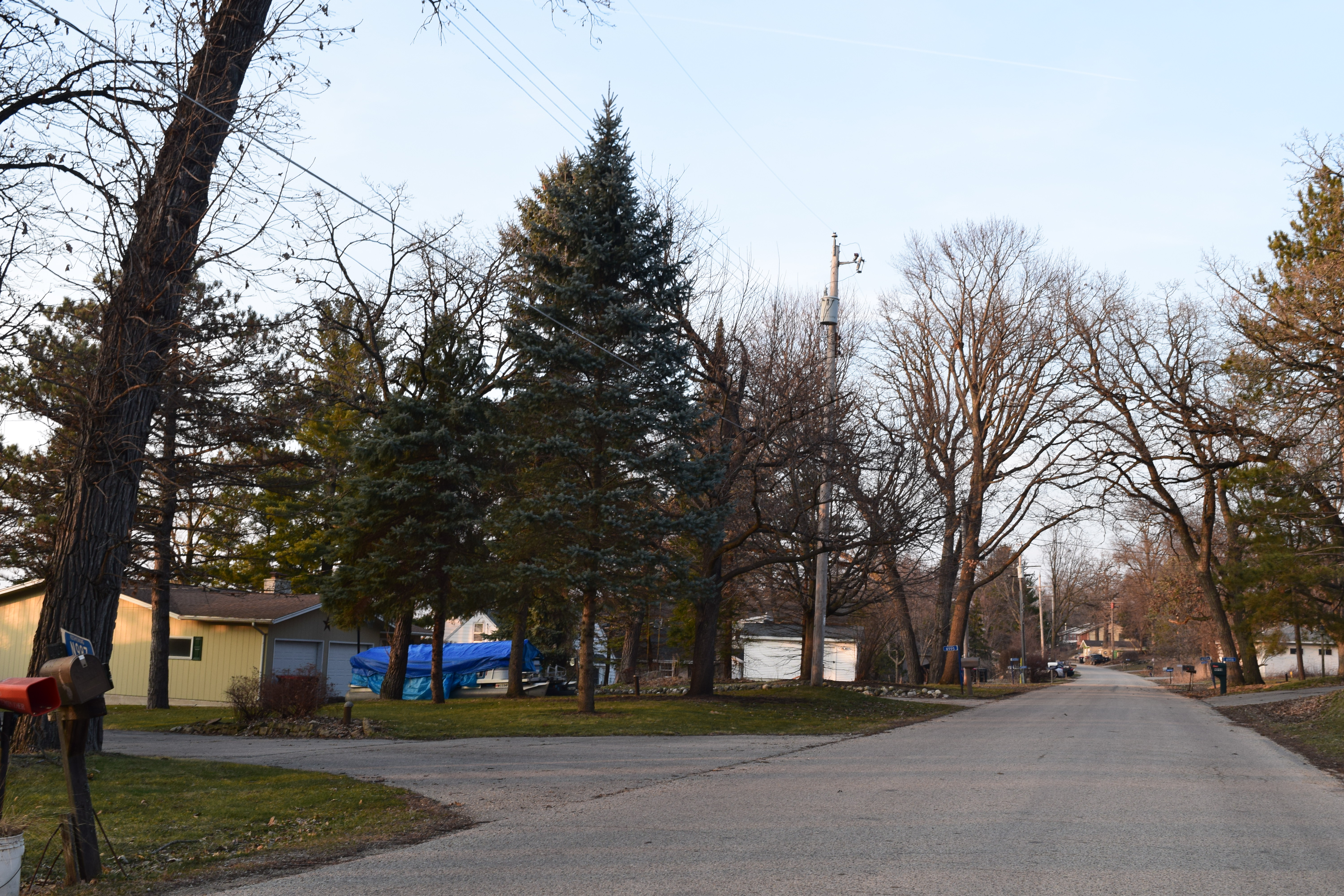

- Location within Wisconsin Location within the United States
- Coordinates: 42°52′50″N 88°54′17″W
- Country: United States
- State: Wisconsin
- County: Jefferson
- Town: Koshkonong
- Elevation: 820 ft (250 m)
- Time zone: UTC-6 (Central (CST))
  - Summer (DST): UTC-5 (CDT)
- Area code: 920
- GNIS feature ID: 1576107

Vinnie Ha Ha is an unincorporated community located in the town of Koshkonong, Jefferson County, Wisconsin, United States.
