= Koshkonong (community), Wisconsin =

Koshkonong, Wisconsin
- Unincorporated community
- Location within Wisconsin Location within the United States
- Coordinates: 42°50′46″N 88°55′09″W
- Country: United States
- State: Wisconsin
- Counties: Jefferson, Rock
- Towns: Koshkonong, Milton
- Elevation: 823 ft (251 m)
- Time zone: UTC-6 (Central (CST))
  - Summer (DST): UTC-5 (CDT)
- Area code: 920
- GNIS feature ID: 1567627

Koshkonong is an unincorporated community located in the towns of Koshkonong, Jefferson County and Milton, Rock County, Wisconsin, United States.

== History ==
A post office called Koshkonong operated between 1839 and 1935. The community took its name from nearby Lake Koshkonong.
