= Energy engineering =

Broad field of engineering dealing with energy

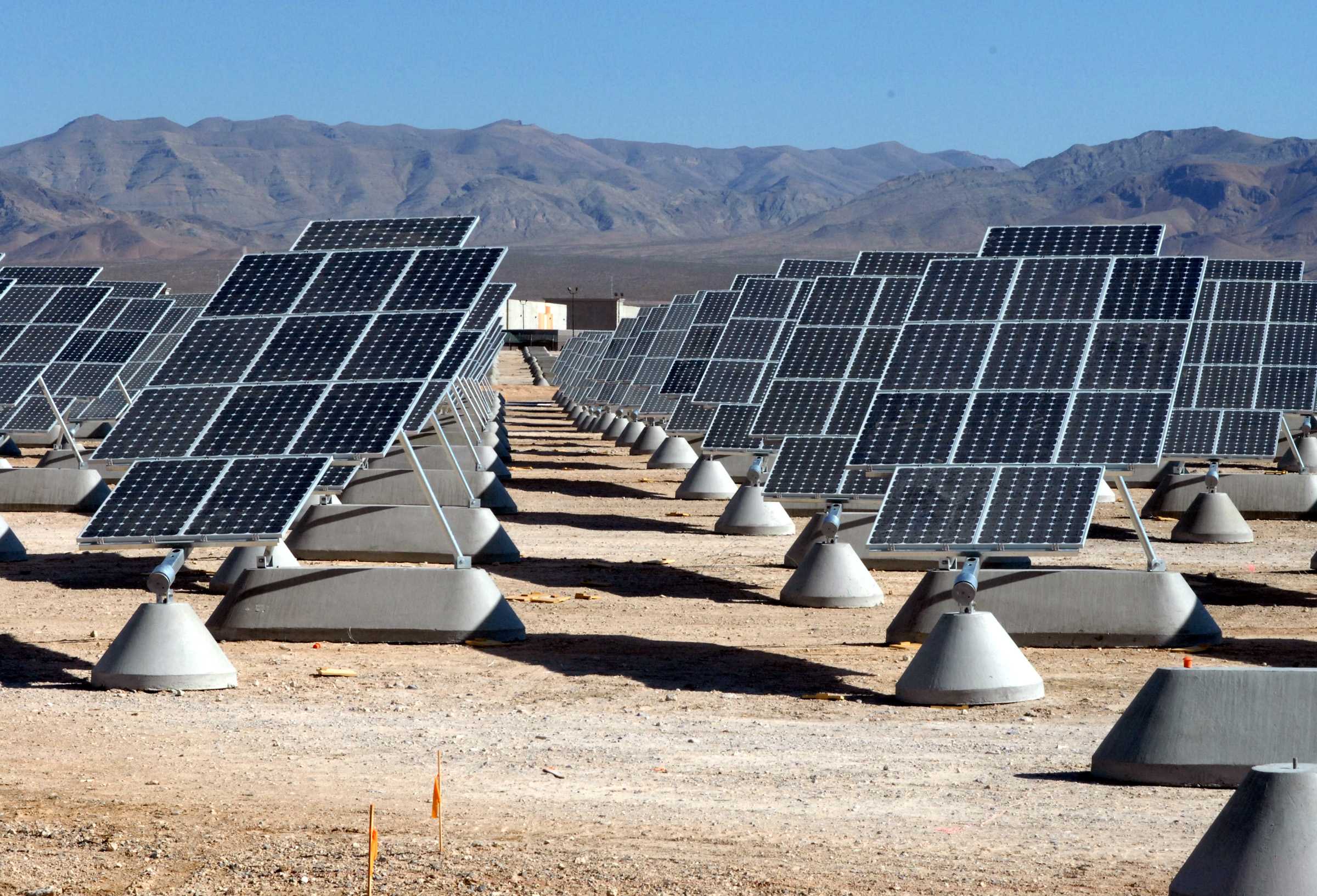
Solar panels, a tool for harnessing renewable energy

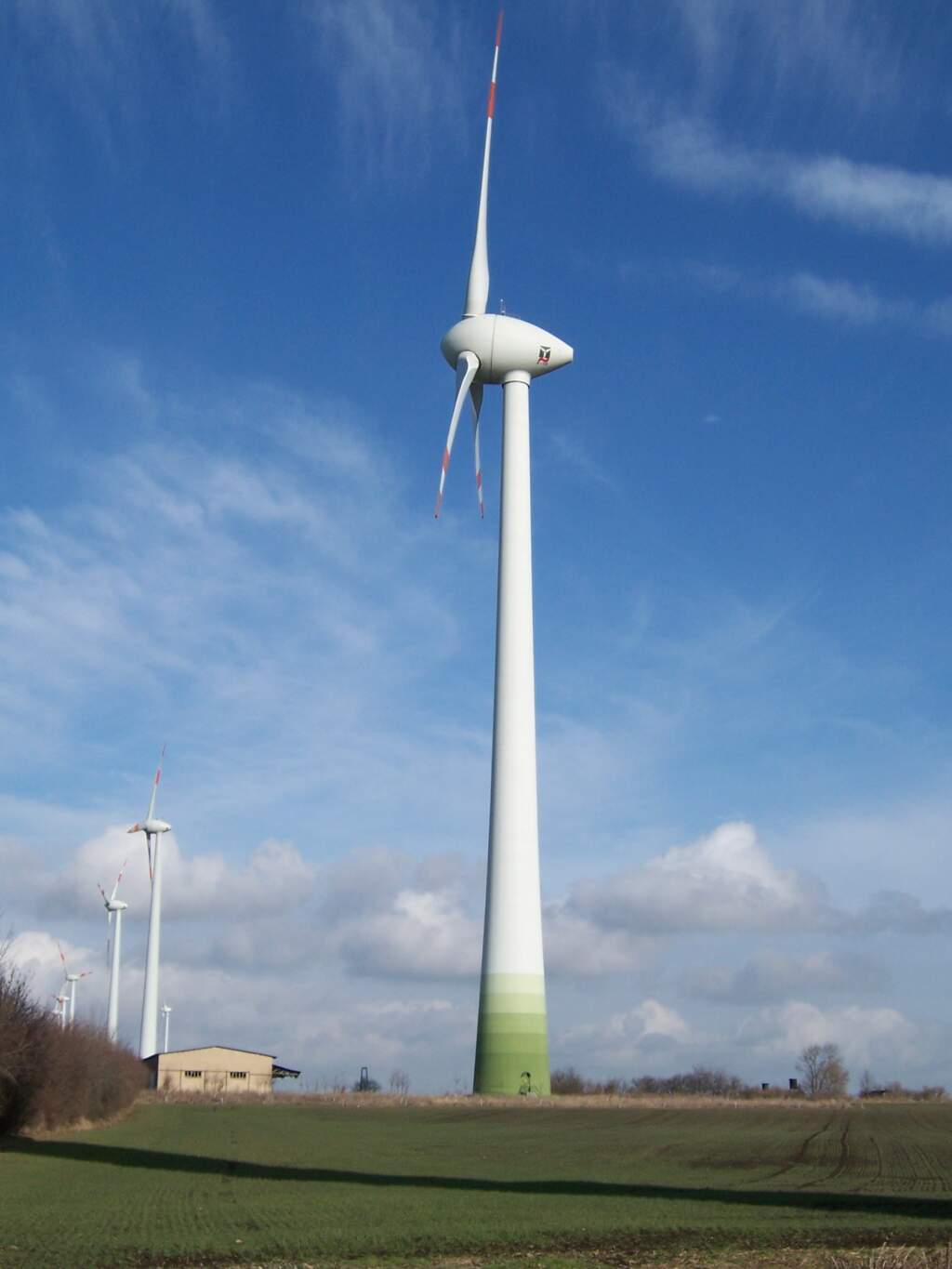
Wind turbines, a tool for harnessing renewable energy

Energy engineering is a multidisciplinary field of engineering that focuses on optimizing energy systems, developing renewable energy technologies, and improving energy efficiency to meet the world's growing demand for energy in a sustainable manner. It encompasses areas such as energy harvesting and storage, energy conversion, energy materials, energy systems, energy efficiency, energy services, facility management, plant engineering, energy modelling, and environmental compliance. As one of the most recent engineering disciplines to emerge, energy engineering plays a critical role in addressing global challenges like climate change, carbon reduction, and the transition from fossil fuels to renewable energy sources and sustainable energy.

Energy engineering is one of the most recent engineering disciplines to emerge. Energy engineering combines knowledge from the fields of physics, math, and chemistry with economic and environmental engineering practices. Energy engineers apply their skills to increase efficiency and further develop renewable sources of energy. The main job of energy engineers is to find the most efficient and sustainable ways to operate buildings and manufacturing processes. Energy engineers audit the use of energy in those processes and suggest ways to improve the systems. This means suggesting advanced lighting, better insulation, more efficient heating and cooling properties of buildings. Although an energy engineer is concerned about obtaining and using energy in the most environmentally friendly ways, their field is not limited to strictly renewable energy like hydro, solar, biomass, or geothermal. Energy engineers are also employed by the fields of oil and natural gas extraction.

== Purpose ==
The primary purpose of energy engineering is to optimize the production and use of energy resources while minimizing energy waste and reducing environmental impact. This discipline is vital for designing systems that consume less energy, meet carbon reduction targets, and improve the energy efficiency of processes in industrial, commercial, and residential sectors. Often applied to building design, heavy consideration is given to HVAC, lighting, refrigeration, to both reduce energy loads and increase efficiency of current systems. Energy engineering is increasingly seen as a major step forward in meeting carbon reduction targets. Since buildings and houses consume over 40% of the United States energy, the services an energy engineer performs are in demand.

== History ==
Human civilizations have long relied on the conversion of energy for various purposes, from the use of fire to the development of water wheels, windmills, and, eventually, electricity generation. The formalization of energy engineering began during the industrial revolution and accelerated in the mid-20th century with advancements in electrical power systems, nuclear energy, and renewable energy technologies. The oil crisis of 1973 highlighted the need for increased energy efficiency and energy independence, leading to the establishment of new government programs and industry standards. In addition, the energy crisis of 1979 brought to light the need to get more work out of less energy. The United States government passed several laws to promote increased energy efficiency, such as United States public law 94-413, the Federal Clean Car Incentive Program.

== Power engineering ==
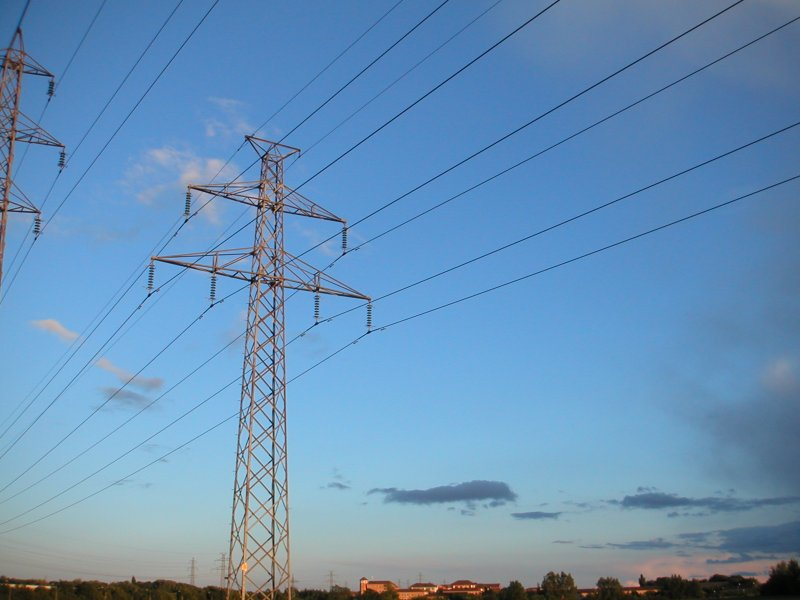
Transmission towers used in transportation of electrical power

Power engineering, often viewed as a subset of electrical engineering, focuses on the generation, transmission, distribution, and utilization of electrical power. This subfield covers critical infrastructure such as power plants, electric grids, and energy storage systems, ensuring the efficient and reliable delivery of energy across various sectors. Emerging technologies in power engineering include the development of smart grids, microgrids, and advanced energy storage systems like lithium-ion batteries and hydrogen fuel cells, which are central to the future of renewable energy integration.

== Leadership in Energy and Environmental Design ==
Leadership in Energy and Environmental Design (LEED) is a program created by the United States Green Building Council (USGBC) in March 2000. LEED is a program that encourages green building and promotes sustainability in the construction of buildings and the efficiency of the utilities in the buildings.

In 2012 the United States Green Building Council asked the independent firm Booz Allen Hamilton to conduct a study on the effectiveness of LEED program. "This study confirmed that green buildings generate substantial energy savings. From 2000–2008, green construction and renovation generated $1.3 billion in energy savings. Of that $1.3 billion, LEED-certified buildings accounted for $281 million." The study also found the summation of all green construction supported 2.4 million jobs.

== Energy efficiency ==
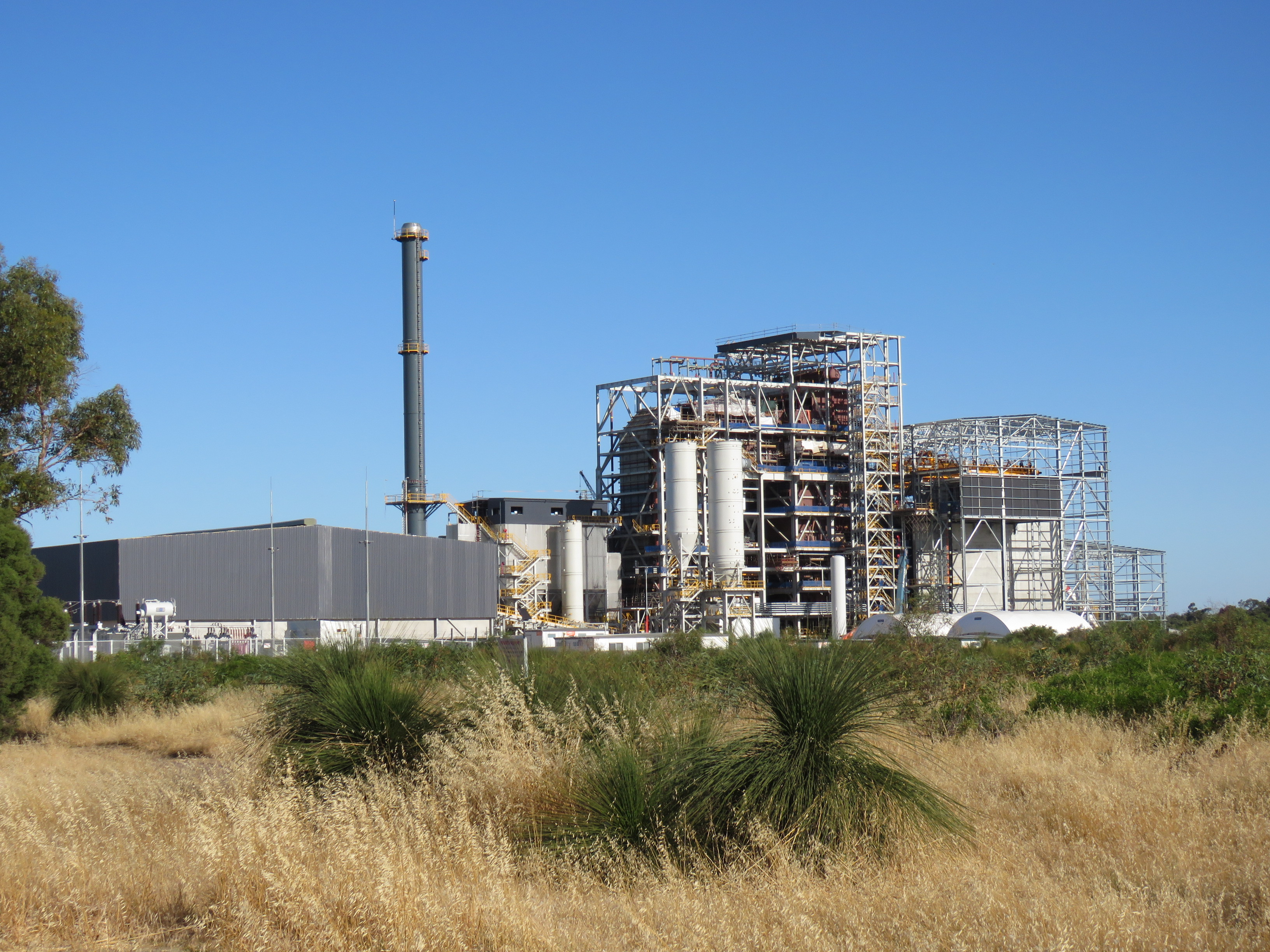
A waste-to-energy plant which can combust wastes to produce energy

Energy efficiency is seen two ways. The first view is that more work is done from the same amount of energy used. The other perception is that the same amount of work is accomplished with less energy used in the system. Some ways to get more work out of less energy is to "Reduce, Reuse, and Recycle" the materials used in daily life. The advancement of technology has led to other uses of waste. Technology such as waste-to-energy facilities which convert solid wastes through the process of gasification or pyrolysis to liquid fuels to be burned. The Environmental Protection Agency stated that the United States produced 250 million tons of municipal waste in 2010. Of that 250 million tons roughly 54% gets thrown in land fills, 33% is recycled, and 13% goes to energy recovery plants. In European countries who pay more for fuel, such as Denmark where the price of gas neared $2.6 per litre ($10/US gal) in 2010, have more fully developed waste-to energy facilities. In 2010 Denmark sent 7% of waste to landfills, 69% was recycled, and 24% was sent to waste-to-energy facilities. There are several other developed Western European countries that also have taken energy engineering into consideration. Germany's "Energiewende", a policy which set the goal by 2050 to meet 80% of electrical needs from renewable energy sources.

== Statistics ==
According to O*NET and Bureau of Labor Statistics data, the median annual wage for energy engineers (except wind and solar) was $122,930 in 2025. Entry-level and experienced ranges vary substantially by location, sector (e.g., professional/scientific services or manufacturing), and specialization in renewables or storage. Women comprise approximately 15-16% of the broader U.S. engineering workforce (BLS/Census and related analyses around 2023-2024), with ongoing efforts through professional societies, scholarships, and mentorship programs to improve representation. Employment for the related “engineers, all other” category (which includes energy engineers) is projected to grow about as fast as the average for all occupations (roughly 3-4%) over the 2025-2035 period, with thousands of annual openings driven by both growth and replacement needs, supported by demand in clean energy, efficiency, and grid modernization.

== Education ==
To become an energy engineer, a bachelor's degree in energy engineering or related fields such as mechanical, electrical, or environmental engineering is typically required. Many universities now offer specialized energy engineering programs with a focus on renewable energy, energy storage, and grid management. Advanced certifications like the Certified Energy Manager (CEM) credential, offered by the Association of Energy Engineers, and graduate programs in sustainable energy systems further improve career plans. Also, several universities across the world have established departments or centers offering energy engineering degrees, to better prepare future engineers for their career. One of those programs is the IEP PEM Certification which is offered at Virginia Tech University.

== Emerging Technologies ==
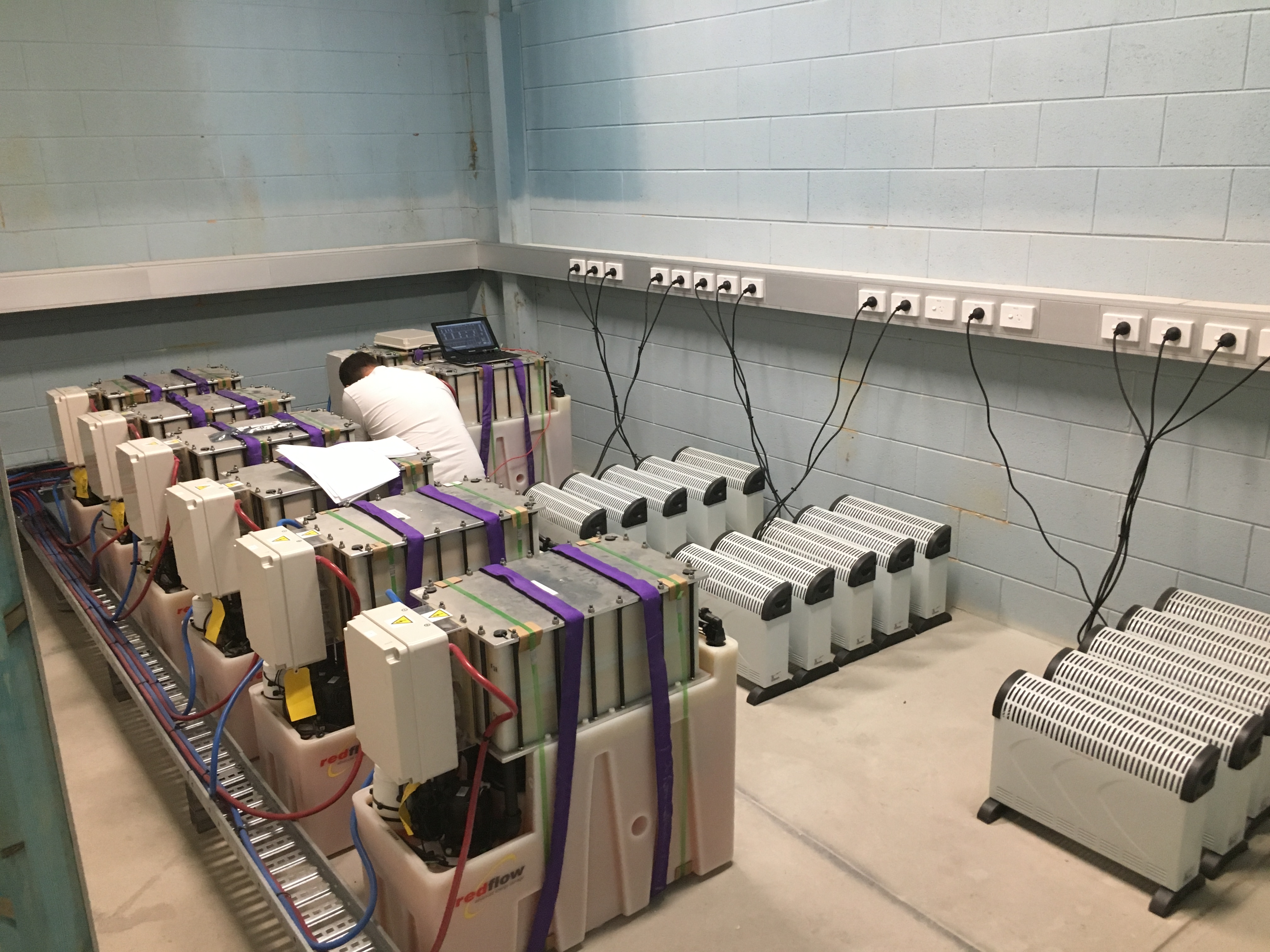
A flow battery used in energy storage

Emerging technologies in energy engineering are reshaping the way energy is produced, stored, and consumed. Innovations such as next-generation solar panels, modern wind turbine innovations, energy storage systems (such as flow batteries and hydrogen fuel cells), and smart grid technologies are paving the way for a more sustainable energy future. These technologies are critical in reducing reliance on fossil fuels and ensuring the stability of renewable energy systems. Other advances include artificial intelligence and machine learning applications for optimizing energy use in real-time, and carbon capture and storage (CCS) systems to mitigate emissions from existing power plants.

== Energy Engineering in Policy and Society ==
Energy engineers play a key role in shaping energy policies and regulations worldwide. Their expertise is essential in setting standards for energy efficiency, renewable energy integration, and reducing carbon footprints. Global initiatives like the Paris Agreement and the European Green Deal are influencing energy engineering practices, pushing the field toward more sustainable and equitable energy solutions. Additionally, energy engineers are increasingly involved in public and private sector collaborations, working with governments and corporations to design and implement large-scale energy infrastructure projects which would have both societal and political impacts.

== See also ==
- Wind energy software
- Power engineering software
