= Koshkonong, Wisconsin =

Town of Koshkonong, Wisconsin
- Town
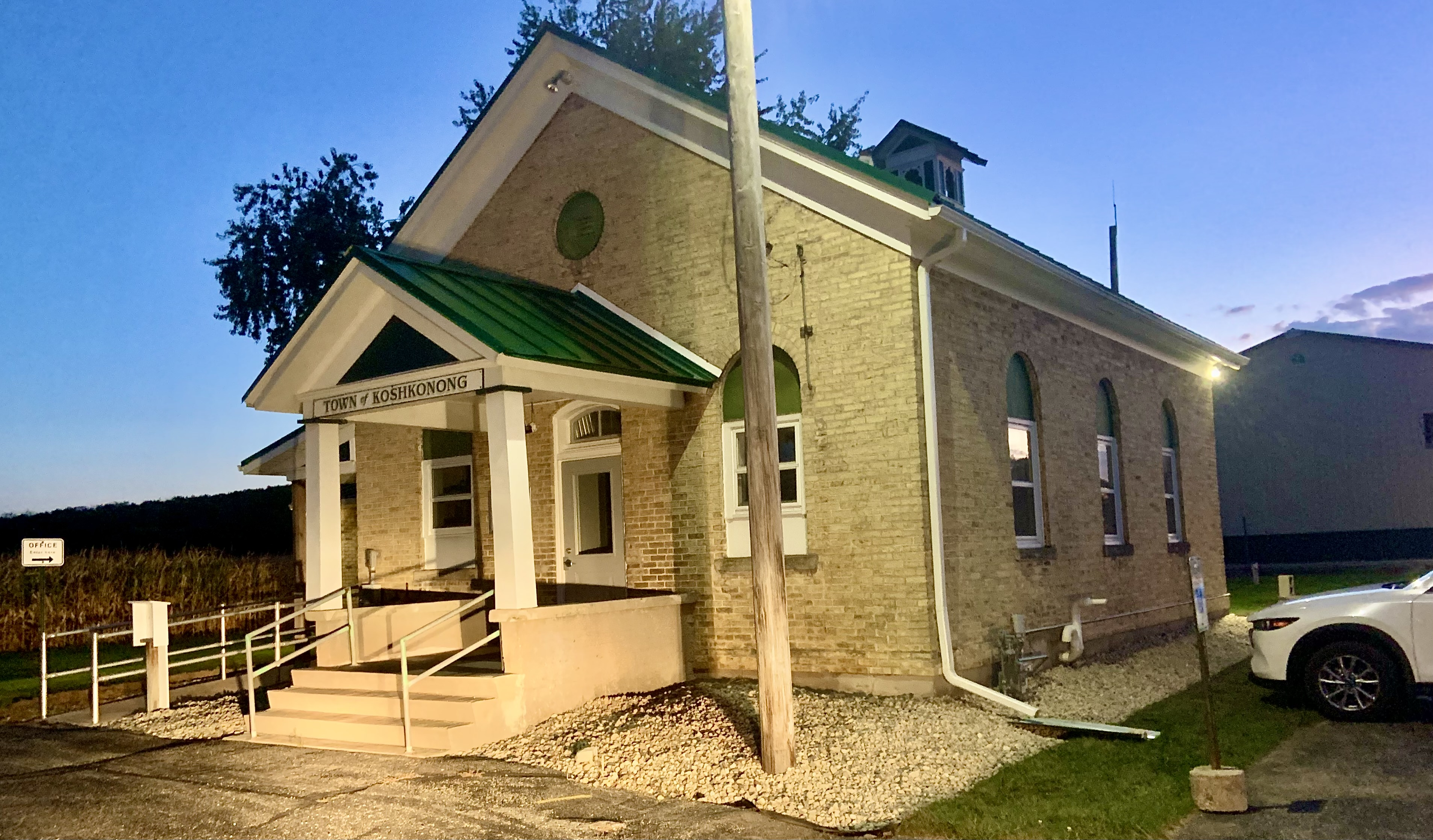
- Town hall

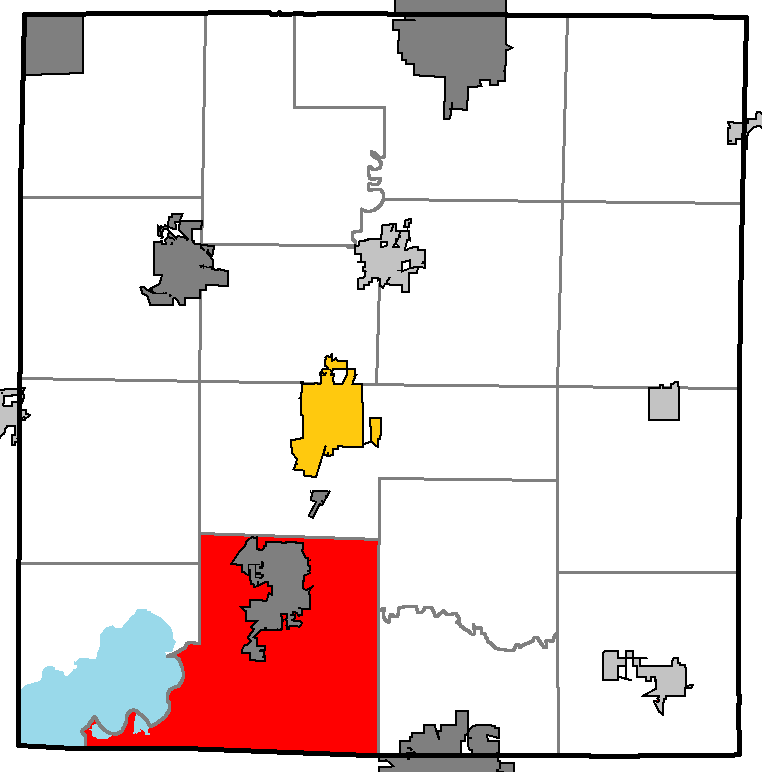
- Location of the Town of Koshkonong, within Jefferson County
- Interactive map of Town of Koshkonong, Wisconsin
- Coordinates: 42°54′0″N 88°50′24″W
- Country: United States
- State: Wisconsin
- County: Jefferson

Area
  - Total: 42.6 sq mi (110.3 km^{2})
  - Land: 41.4 sq mi (107.3 km^{2})
  - Water: 1.2 sq mi (3.0 km^{2})
- Elevation: 810 ft (250 m)

Population (2020)
  - Total: 3,763
  - Density: 90.83/sq mi (35.07/km^{2})
- Time zone: UTC-6 (Central (CST))
  - Summer (DST): UTC-5 (CDT)
- FIPS code: 55-40375
- GNIS feature ID: 1583494
- Website: koshkonongwi.gov

Koshkonong is a town in Jefferson County, Wisconsin, United States. The population was 3,763 at the 2020 census. The town entirely surrounds the city of Fort Atkinson. The unincorporated communities of Koshkonong Mounds and Vinnie Ha Ha are located in the town. The unincorporated communities of Blackhawk Island and Koshkonong, as well as the census-designated place of Lake Koshkonong are also located partially in the town.

== History ==
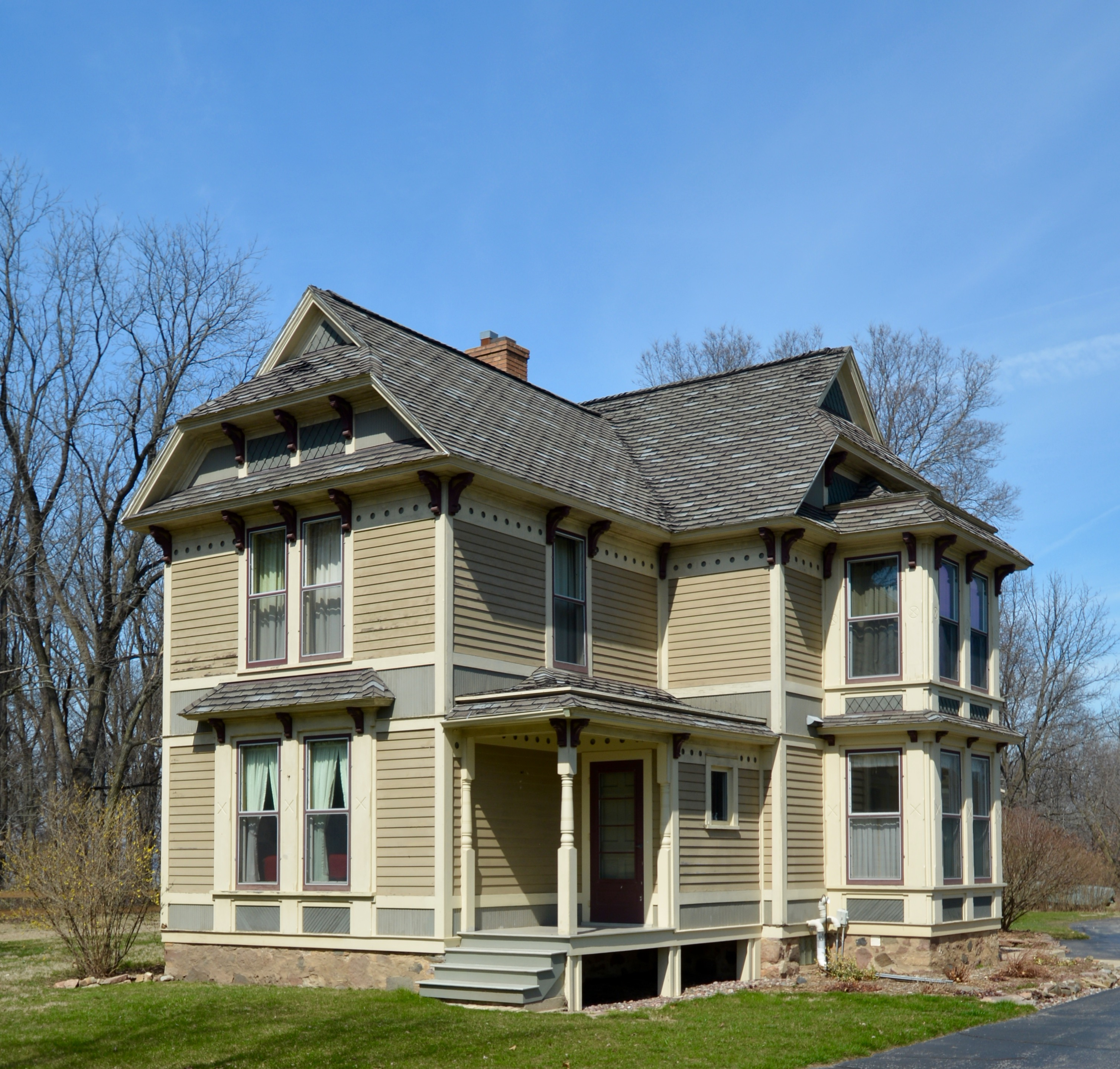
Albert and Mary Shekey House in Koshkonong

The Sauk, Meskwaki, Potawatomi, and Ho-Chunk peoples had members in the area when settlers arrived. The first Europeans to settle in the area were French traders from Canada. The region about the Yahara River was called Gishkzhegonang (Catfish Place) by the Potawatomi peoples, and was transcribed into English as "Koshkonong." The Potawatomis called Lake Koshkonong as Éndayang-zagegen (Lake Where-we-live-on), but the early settlers began calling this lake in the Koshkonong region as Lake Koshkonong.

The first settlers for farming arrived around 1836. Under the government of the Wisconsin Territory, the town was originally named Finch in 1839, but was renamed Koshkonong in 1842.

== Geography ==
According to the United States Census Bureau, the town has a total area of 42.6 square miles (110.3 km^{2}), of which 41.4 square miles (107.3 km^{2}) is land and 1.2 square miles (3.0 km^{2}), or 2.75%, is water.

The southeast shore of Lake Koshkonong forms part of the western border of the town.

U.S. Route 12 crosses the town from southeast to northwest, passing through Fort Atkinson.

== Demographics ==
Historical population
Census	Pop.	Note	%±
2000	3,395		—
2010	3,692		8.7%
2020	3,763		1.9%
U.S. Decennial Census

As of the census of 2000, there were 3,395 people, 1,249 households, and 965 families residing in the town. The population density was 80.7 people per square mile (31.2/km^{2}). There were 1,421 housing units at an average density of 33.8 per square mile (13.0/km^{2}). The racial makeup of the town was 97.91% White, 0.03% African American, 0.29% Native American, 0.18% Asian, 0.53% from other races, and 1.06% from two or more races. Hispanic or Latino of any race were 1.77% of the population.

There were 1,249 households, out of which 33.2% had children under the age of 18 living with them, 67.6% were married couples living together, 5.8% had a female householder with no husband present, and 22.7% were non-families. 17.4% of all households were made up of individuals, and 7.8% had someone living alone who was 65 years of age or older. The average household size was 2.69 and the average family size was 3.02.

In the town, the population was spread out, with 25.3% under the age of 18, 6.5% from 18 to 24, 27.7% from 25 to 44, 29.4% from 45 to 64, and 11.1% who were 65 years of age or older. The median age was 40 years. For every 100 females, there were 104.5 males. For every 100 females age 18 and over, there were 101.8 males.

The median income for a household in the town was $60,000, and the median income for a family was $61,604. Males had a median income of $40,676 versus $26,909 for females. The per capita income for the town was $24,100. About 2.0% of families and 3.3% of the population were below the poverty line, including 1.2% of those under age 18 and 4.4% of those age 65 or over.

== Notable people ==
Notable people that were born or lived in Koshkonong include:

- Rasmus B. Anderson (1846–1936), scholar
- Charles N. Herreid (1857–1928), governor of South Dakota
- Victor Lawson (1850–1925), newspaper publisher
- Andrew E. Lee (1847–1934), governor of South Dakota
- Knute Nelson (1843–1923), politician
- Sterling North (1906–1974), author
