= Power plant engineering =

Energy Field

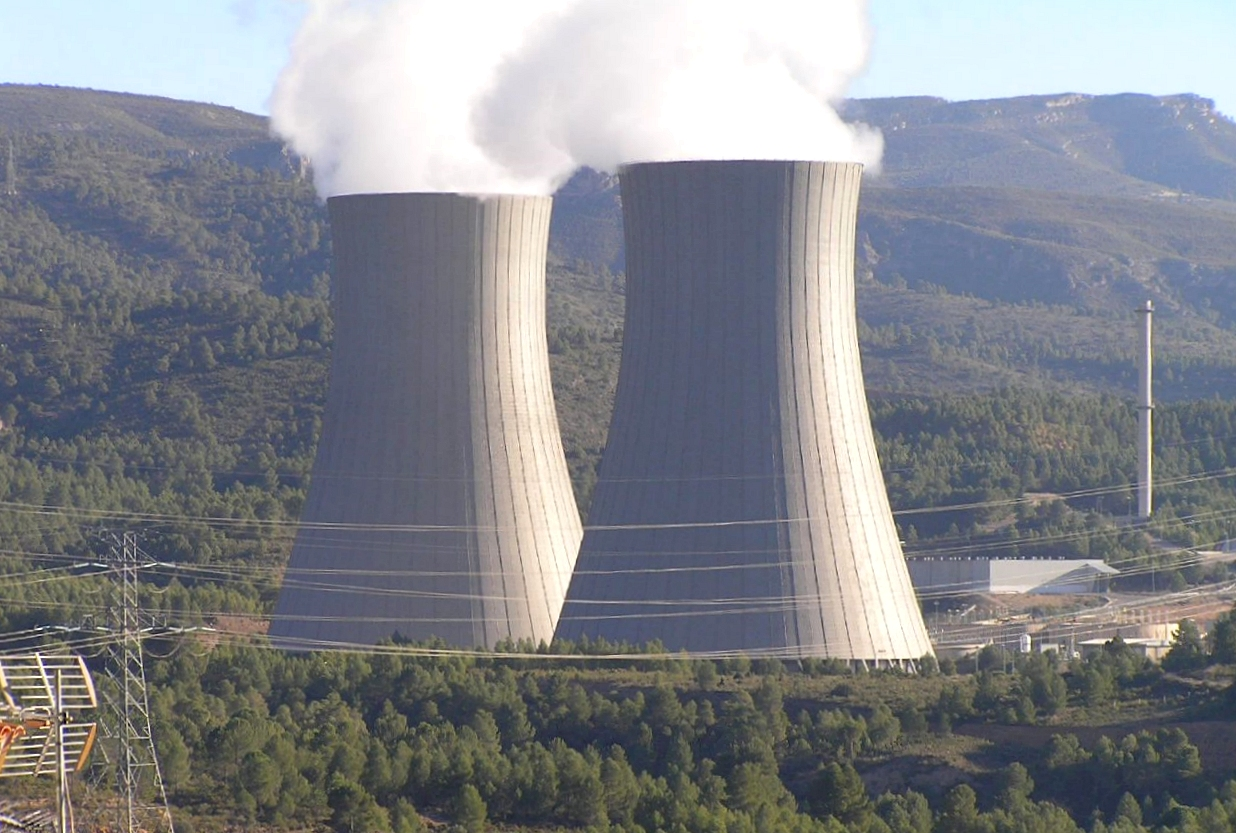
Cooling tower Nuclear power plant

Power plant engineering, abbreviated as TPTL, is a branch of the field of energy engineering, and is defined as the engineering and technology required for the production of an electric power station. Technique is focused on power generation for industry and community, not just for household electricity production. This field is a discipline field using the theoretical basis of mechanical engineering and electrical. The engineering aspects of power generation have developed with technology and are becoming more and more complicated. The introduction of nuclear technology and other existing technology advances have made it possible for power to be created in more ways and on a larger scale than was previously possible. Assignment of different types of engineers for the design, construction, and operation of new power plants depending on the type of system being built, such as whether it is fueled by fossil fuels, nuclear, hydropower, or solar power.

== History ==
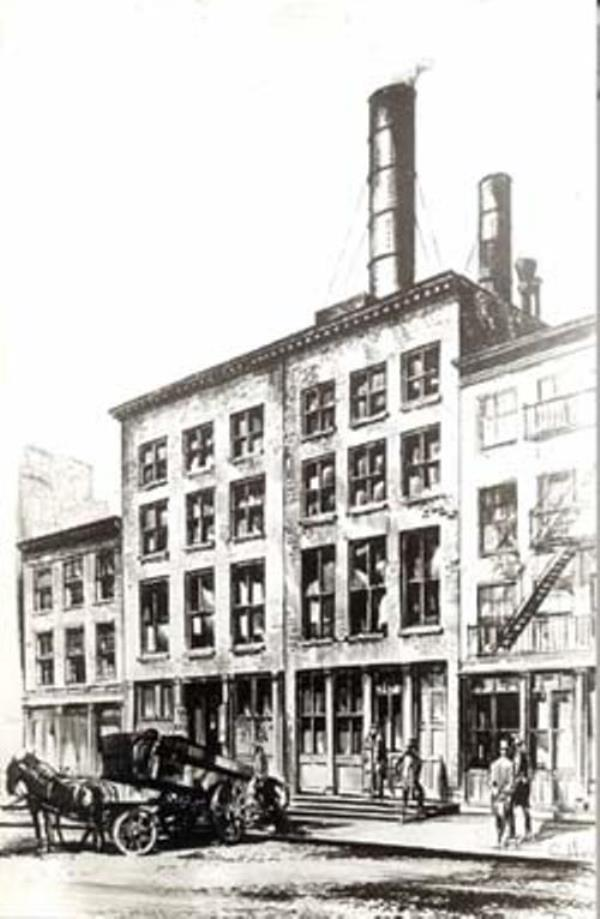
Pearl Street Station 1882

Power plant engineering got its start in the 1800s when small systems were used by individual factories to provide electrical power. Originally the only source of power came from DC, or direct current, systems. While this was suitable for business, electricity was not accessible for most of the public body. During these times, the coal-powered steam engine was costly to run and there was no way for the power to be transmitted over distances. Hydroelectricity was one of the most utilized forms of power generation as water mills could be used to create power to transmit to small towns.

It wasn't until the introduction of AC, or alternating current, power systems that allowed for the creation of power plants as we know them today. AC systems allowed power to be transmitted over larger distances than DC systems allowed and thus, large power stations were able to be created. One of the progenitors of long-distance power-transmission was the Lauffen to Frankfurt power plant which spanned 109 miles. The Lauffen-Frankfurt demonstrated how three-phase power could be effectively applied to transmit power over long distances. Three-phase power had been the progeny of years of research in power distribution and the Lauffen-Frankfurt was the first exhibition to show its future potential.

The engineering knowledge needed to perform these tasks enlists the help of several fields of engineering including mechanical, electrical, nuclear and civil engineers. When power plants were up and coming, engineering tasks needed to create these facilities mainly consisted of mechanical, civil, and electrical engineers. These disciplines allowed for the planning and construction of power plants. But when nuclear power plants were created it introduced nuclear engineers to perform the calculations necessary to maintain safety standards.

== Governing principles ==
=== First Law of Thermodynamics ===
In simple terms, the first law of thermodynamics states that energy cannot be created nor destroyed; however, power can be converted from one form of energy to another form of energy. This is especially important in power generation because power production in nearly all types of power plants relies upon the use of a generator. Generators are used to convert mechanical energy into electrical energy; for example, wind turbines utilize a large blade connected to a shaft which turns the generator when rotated. The generator then creates electricity due to the interaction of a conductor within a magnetic field. In this case, the mechanical energy generated by the wind is converted, through the generator, into electric energy. Most power plants rely on these conversions to create usable electric power.

=== Second law of thermodynamics ===
The second law of thermodynamics conceptualizes that the entropy of a closed system can never decrease. As the law relates to power plants, it dictates that heat is to flow from a body at high temperature to a body at low temperature (the device in which electricity is being generated). This law is particularly pertinent to thermal power plants which derive their energy from the combustion of a fuel source.

== Types of power plants ==
All power plants are created with the same goal: to produce electric power as efficiently as possible. However, as technology has evolved, the sources of energy used in power plants has evolved as well. The introduction of more renewable/sustainable forms of energy has caused an increase in the improvement and creation of certain power plants.

=== Hydroelectric power plants ===
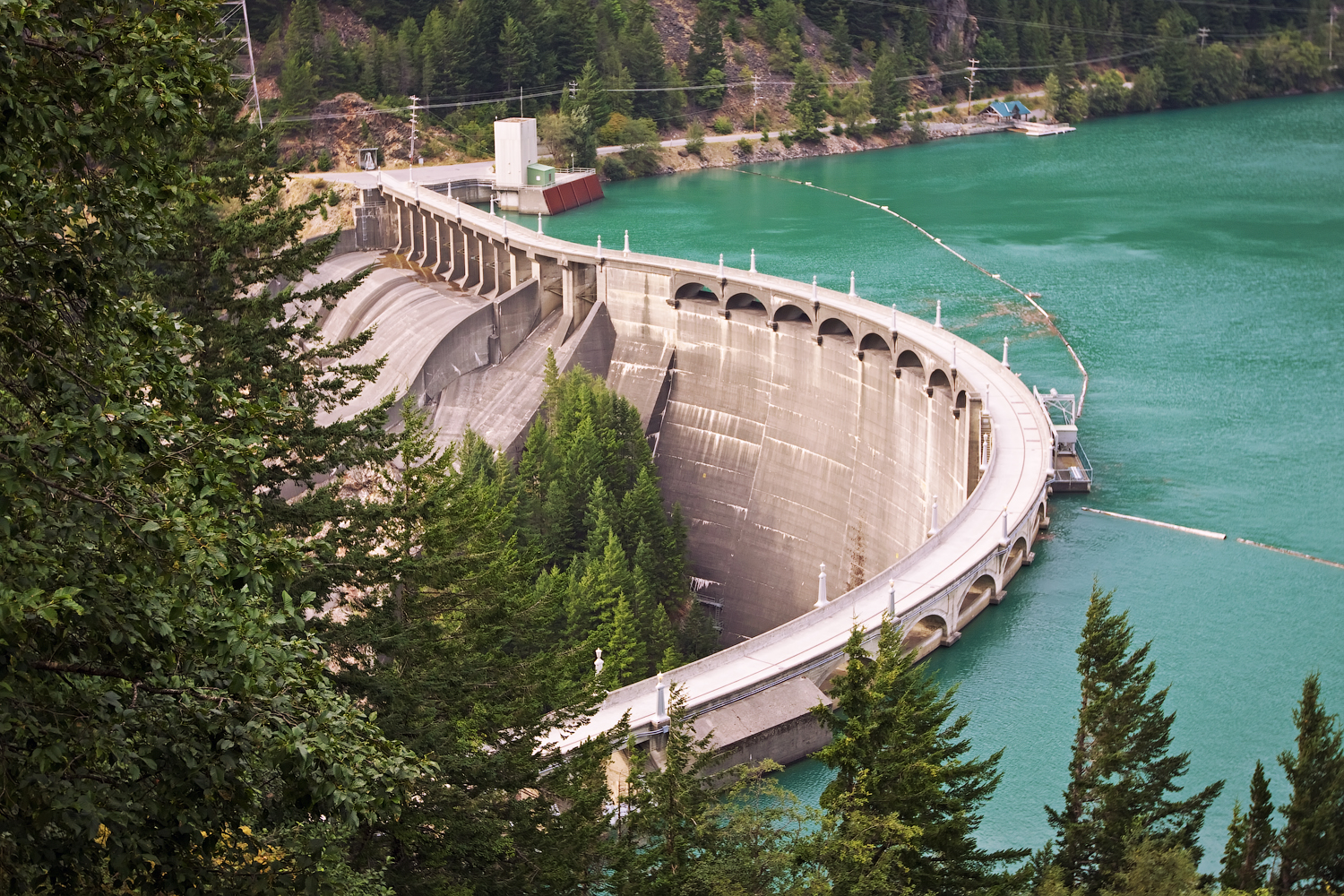
Hydroelectric Dam

Hydroelectric power plants generate power using the force of water to turn generators. They can be categorized into three different types; impoundment, diversion and pumped storage. Impoundment and diversion hydroelectric power plants operate similarly in that each involves creating a barrier to keep water from flowing at an uncontrollable rate, and then controlling the flow rate of water to pass through turbines to create electricity at an ideal level. Hydraulic civil engineers are in charge of calculating flow rates and other volumetric calculations necessary to turn the generators to the electrical engineers specifications. Pumped storage hydroelectric power plants operate in a similar manner but only function at peak hours of power demand. At calm hours the water is pumped uphill, then is released at peak hours to flow from a high to low elevation to turn turbines. The engineering knowledge required to assess the performance of pumped-storage hydroelectric power plants is very similar to that of the impoundment and diversion power plants.

=== Thermal power plants ===
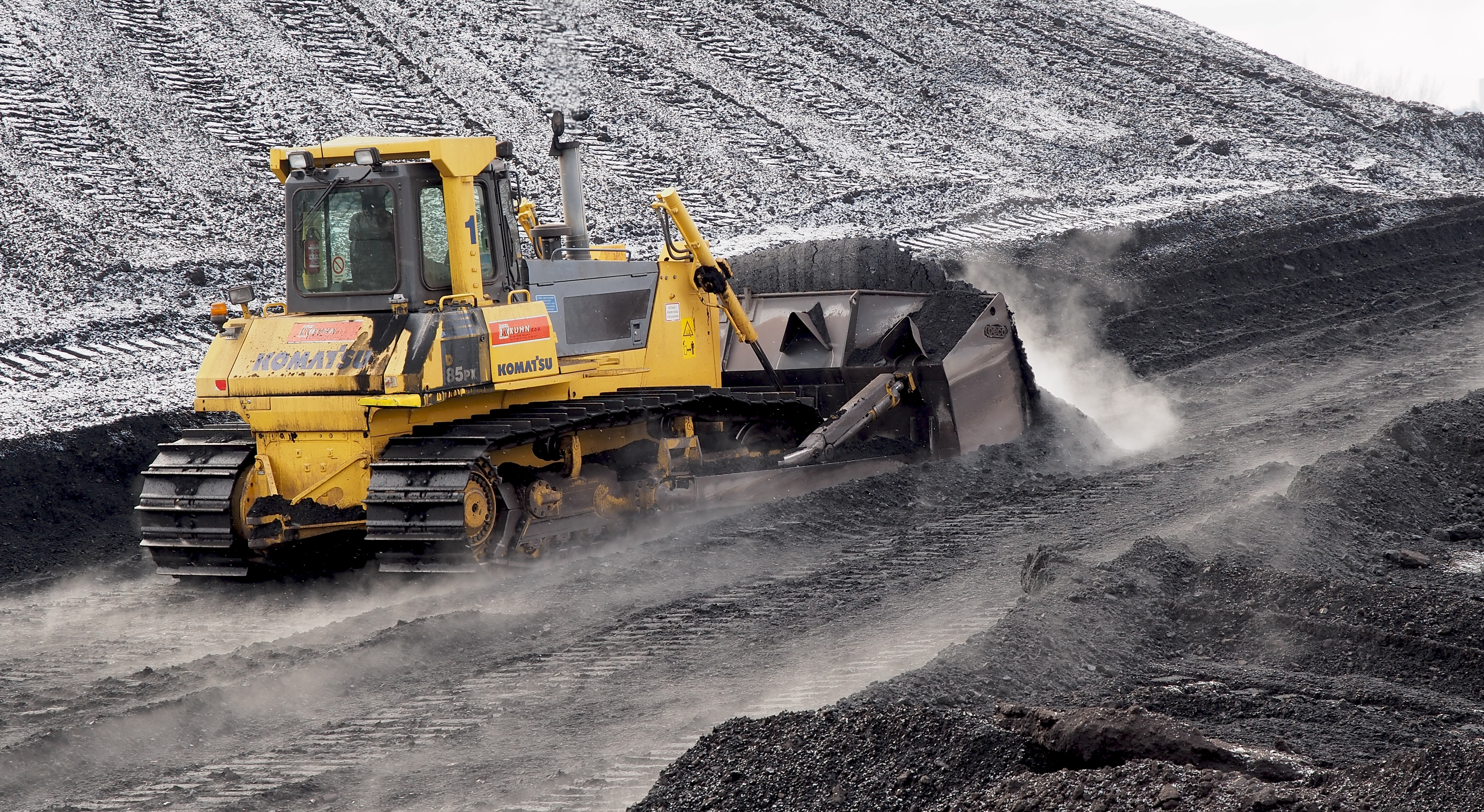
Coal being pushed into coal power plant

Thermal power plants are split into two different categories; those that create electricity by burning fuel and those that create electricity via prime mover. A common example of a thermal power plant that produces electricity by the consumption of fuel is the nuclear power plant. Nuclear power plants use a nuclear reactor's heat to turn water into steam. This steam is sent through a turbine which is connected to an electric generator to generate electricity. Nuclear power plants account for 20% of America's electricity generation. Furthermore, nuclear power plants in the U.S are designed two ways. One way is called direct cycle plants and the other is dual cycle plants. Direct cycle plants make stream within the reactor, and then this steam pushes the turbine. Dual cycle plants use two thermodynamic cycles in a single system. An example of a dual cycle system are pressurized water reactors. Another example of a fuel burning power plant is coal power plant. Coal power plants generate 50% of the United States' electricity supply. Coal power plants operate in a manner similar to nuclear power plants in that the heat from the burning coal powers a steam turbine and electric generator. There are several types of engineers that work in a Thermal Power Plant. Mechanical engineers maintain performance of the thermal power plants while keeping the plants in operation. Nuclear engineers generally handle fuel efficiency and disposal of nuclear waste; however, in Nuclear Power Plants they work directly with nuclear equipment. Electrical Engineers deal with the power generating equipment, as well as the calculations.

=== Solar power plants ===
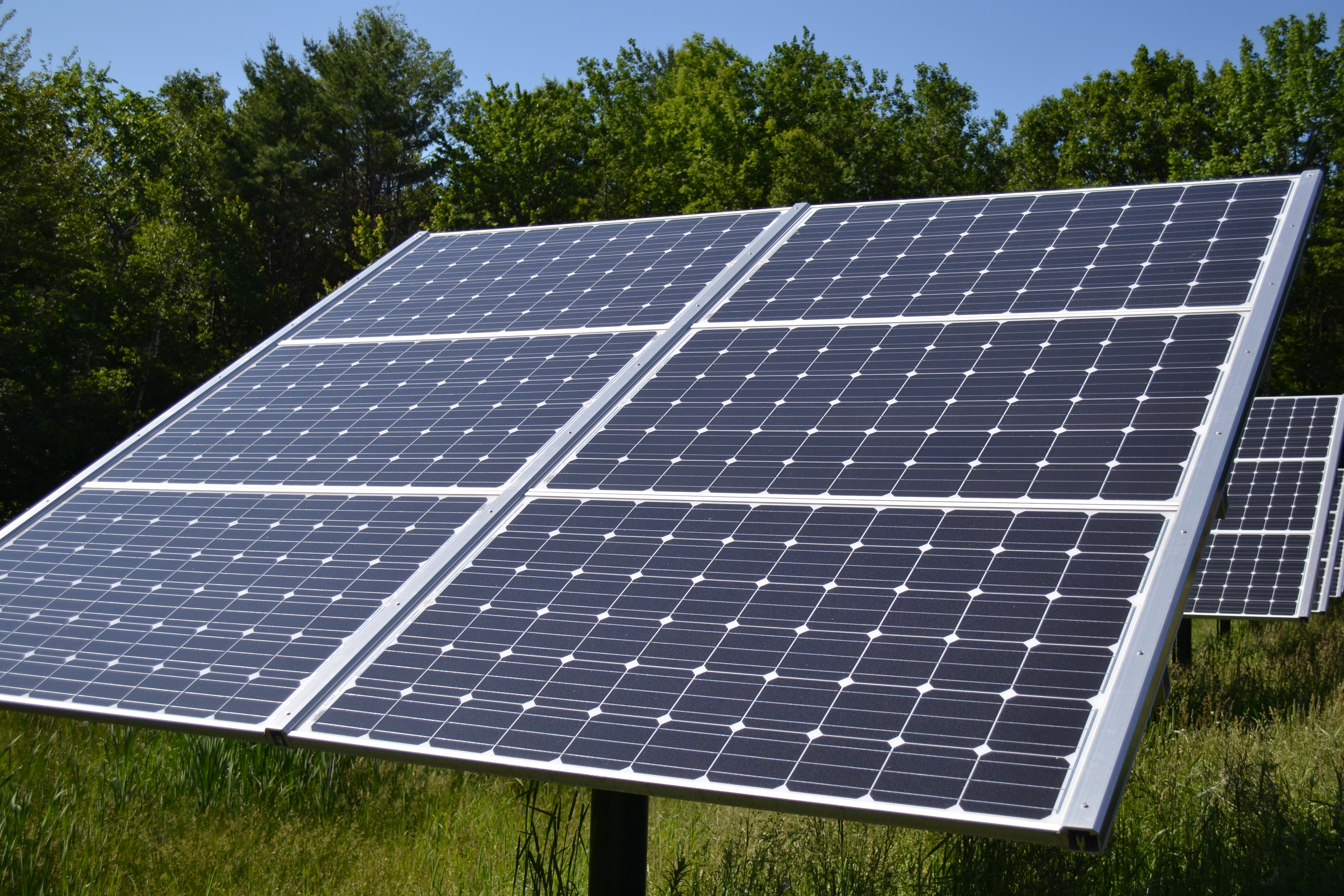
Solar field

Solar power plants derive their energy from sunlight, which is made accessible via photovoltaics (PV's). Photovoltaic panels, or solar panels, are constructed using photovoltaic cells which are made of silica materials that release electrons when they are warmed by the thermal energy of the sun. The new flow of electrons generates electricity within the cell. While PV's are an efficient method of producing electricity, they do burn out after a decade and thus, must be replaced; however, their efficiency, cost of operation, and lack of noise/physical pollutants make them one of the cleanest and least expensive forms of energy. Solar power plants require the work of many facets of engineering; electrical engineers are especially crucial in constructing the solar panels and connecting them into a grid, and computer engineers code the cells themselves so that electricity can be effectively and efficiently produced, and civil engineers play the very important role of identifying areas where solar plants are able to collect the most energy.

=== Wind power plants ===
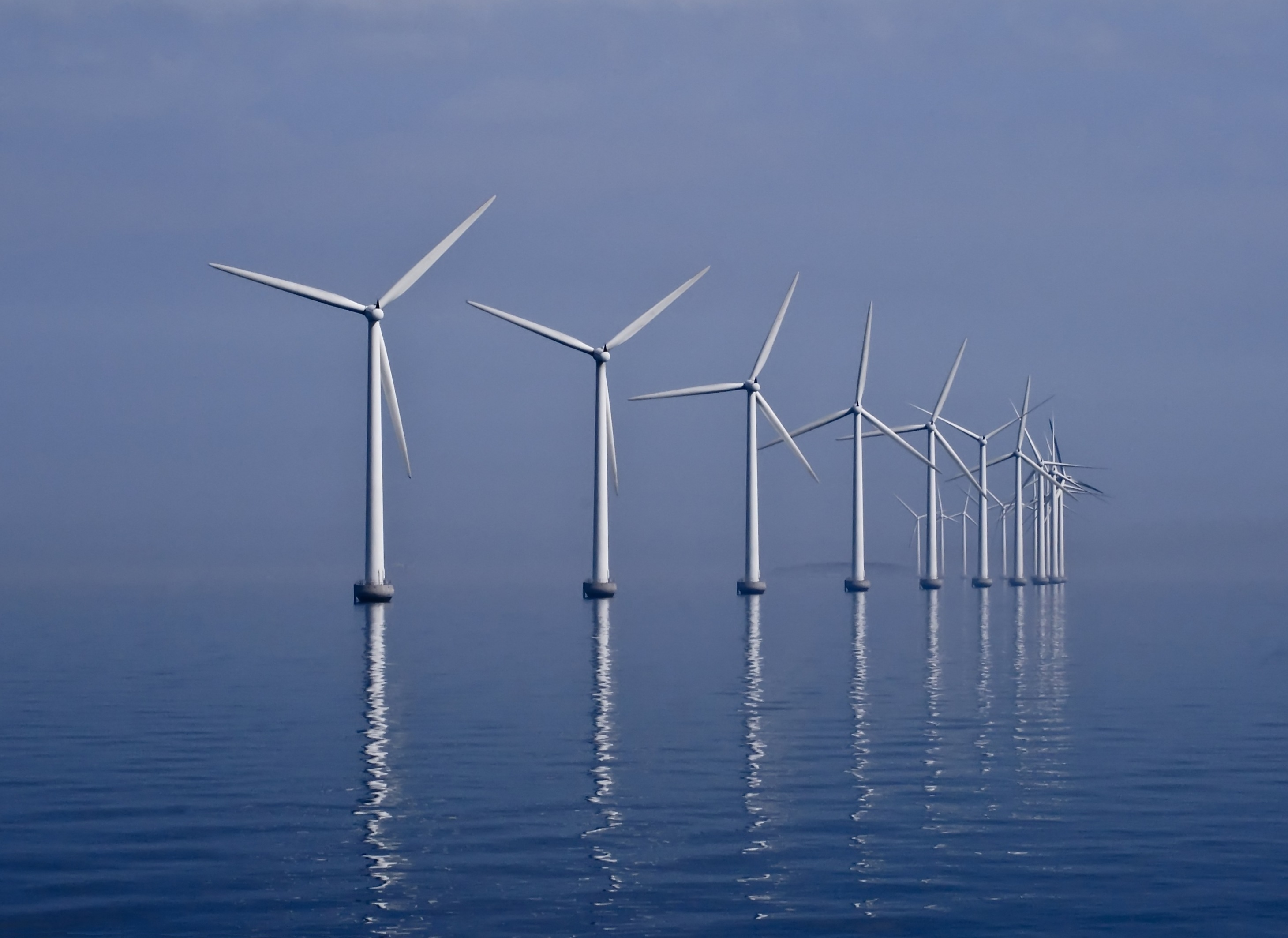
Wind power plant

Wind power plants, also known as wind turbines, derive their energy from the wind by connecting a generator to the fan blades and using the rotational motion caused by wind to power the generator. Then the generated power is fed back into the power grid. Wind power plants can be implemented on large, open expanses of land or on large bodies of water such as the oceans; they rely on being in areas that experience significant amounts of wind. Technically, wind turbines are a form of solar power in that they rely on pressure differentials caused by uneven heating of the Earth's atmosphere. Wind turbines solicit knowledge from mechanical, electrical, and civil engineers. Knowledge of fluid dynamics from the help of mechanical engineers is crucial in determining the viability of locations for wind turbines. Electrical engineers ensure that power generation and transmission is possible. Civil engineers are important in the construction and utilization of wind turbines.

== Education ==
Power plant engineering covers a broad spectrum of engineering disciplines. The field can solicit information from mechanical, chemical, electrical, nuclear, and civil engineers.

=== Mechanical ===
Mechanical engineers work to maintain and control machinery that is used to power the plant. To work in this field, mechanical engineers require a bachelor's degree in Engineering and license passing both the Professional Engineering Exam (PE) and Fundamental Engineering Exam (FE). Mechanical engineers have additional roles that are needed to be considered based on their careers. When working in thermal power plants, mechanical engineers make sure heavy machinery like boilers and turbines, are working in optimal condition and power is continually generated. Mechanical engineers also work with the operations of the plant. In nuclear and hydraulic power plants the engineers work to make sure that heavy machinery is maintained and preventive maintenance is performed.

=== Electrical ===
Electrical engineers work with electrical appliances while making sure electronic instruments and appliances are working in company and state level satisfaction. They require licenses passing both the Professional Engineering Exam (PE) and Fundamental Engineering Exam (FE). It is also preferred that they have a bachelor's degree approved by the Accreditation Board of Engineering and Technology, Inc. (ABET) and field experience before getting an entry-level position.

=== Nuclear ===
Nuclear engineers develop and research methods, machinery and systems concerning radiation and energy in subatomic levels. They require on-site experience and a bachelor's degree in engineering. These engineers work in Nuclear Power plants and require licenses for practice while working in the power plant. They require work experience, passing the Professional Engineering Exam (PE), Fundamental Engineering Exam (FE), and a degree from an Accreditation Board for Engineering and Technology, Inc (ABET) approved school. Nuclear engineers work with the handling of nuclear material and operations of a nuclear power plant. These operations can range from handling of nuclear wastes, nuclear material experiments, and design of nuclear equipment.

=== Civil ===
Civil engineers focuses on the power plant's construction, expenses, and building. Civil Engineers require passing the Professional Engineering Exam (PE), Fundamental Engineering Exam (FE), and a degree from an Accreditation Board of Engineering and Technology, Inc. (ABET) approved school. They work with making sure the structure of the power plant, the location, and the design and safety of the power plant.

=== Associations ===
While there are many disparities between the aforementioned engineering disciplines, they all cover material related to heat or electricity transmission. Obtaining a degree from an ABET accredited school in any one of these disciplines is essential to becoming a power plant engineer. There are also many associations which qualified engineers can join, including the American Society of Mechanical Engineers (ASME), the Institute of Electric and Electronic Engineers (IEEE), and the American Society of Power Engineers (ASOPE).

== Fields ==
Power plant operation and maintenance consists of optimizing the efficiency and power output of power plants and ensuring long term operation. These power plants are large scale, and used to supply power for communities and industry. Individual household electric power generators are not included.

Power station design consists of the design of new power plant systems. There are many types of power plants, and each type requires specific expertise, as well as interdisciplinary teamwork, to build a modern system.

== See also ==
- Power engineering
- Mechanical engineering
- Electrical engineering
- Civil engineering
- Photovoltaics
- Thermal power station
- Hydroelectricity
- First law of thermodynamics
- Second law of thermodynamics
- Wind power
