= Koshkonong Mounds, Wisconsin =

- Unincorporated community
- Location within Wisconsin Location within the United States
- Coordinates: 42°52′27″N 88°54′43″W
- Country: United States
- State: Wisconsin
- County: Jefferson
- Town: Koshkonong
- Elevation: 840 ft (260 m)
- Time zone: UTC-6 (Central (CST))
  - Summer (DST): UTC-5 (CDT)
- Area code: 920
- GNIS feature ID: 1567630

Koshkonong Mounds is an unincorporated community located in the town of Koshkonong, Jefferson County, Wisconsin, United States. It was named for the prehistoric earthwork mounds built by an early indigenous people in the area.

They were likely related to the Mississippian culture, which established settlements and constructed mounds from 1000-1500 CE throughout the areas of the Mississippi River and its tributaries. Archeological artifacts found in the settlements show widespread trading from settlements in the Great Lakes to present-day Illinois and the center of Cahokia, to other settlements in the present-day southeastern United States.
