= Fort Koshkonong =

Military fort

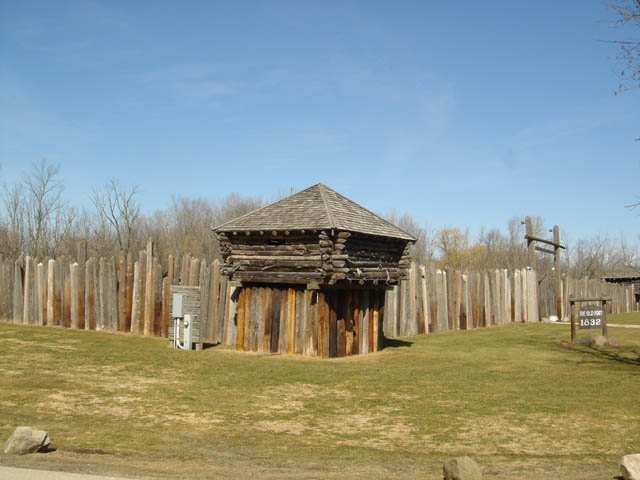
Replica of the fort. It is not located at the original location of the fort.

Fort Koshkonong (Fort Cosconong) was a military fort located near the present-day city of Fort Atkinson, Wisconsin. Intended to control the confluence of the Bark and Rock rivers, it was used as a station for local militia units and the U.S. regulars in the region to scout the British Band, a group of Native Americans who fought against government units during the 1832 Black Hawk War. General Henry Atkinson was the commander of the fort during the war. Black Hawk was in the same general area, but evaded capture and started to flee towards the Wisconsin River. The original fort was abandoned by the Army following the conflict. Local settlers dismantled it for the wood as the town developed.

Today the fort's original location along the Rock River is marked with a monument. The city built a replica of the fort during the Great Depression of the 1930s as a Works Progress Administration (WPA) project funded by the President Franklin D. Roosevelt administration. Its overall size is somewhat larger than the original fort, but provides a representation of how it looked during the Black Hawk War.

Fort Koshkonong shares its name with Lake Koshkonong, which is several miles downriver. Very shallow, the lake at the time of the fort's activity was more of a marsh with the river flowing through it. It increased in size when the river was dammed and is one of the larger lakes in Wisconsin in acreage.

The replica is located about a mile and a half west in Rock River Park.

== Notes ==
42°55′37″N 088°49′52″W 42°55.541′N 088°51.475′W
