= Jefferson County, Wisconsin =

County in Wisconsin, United States

- County
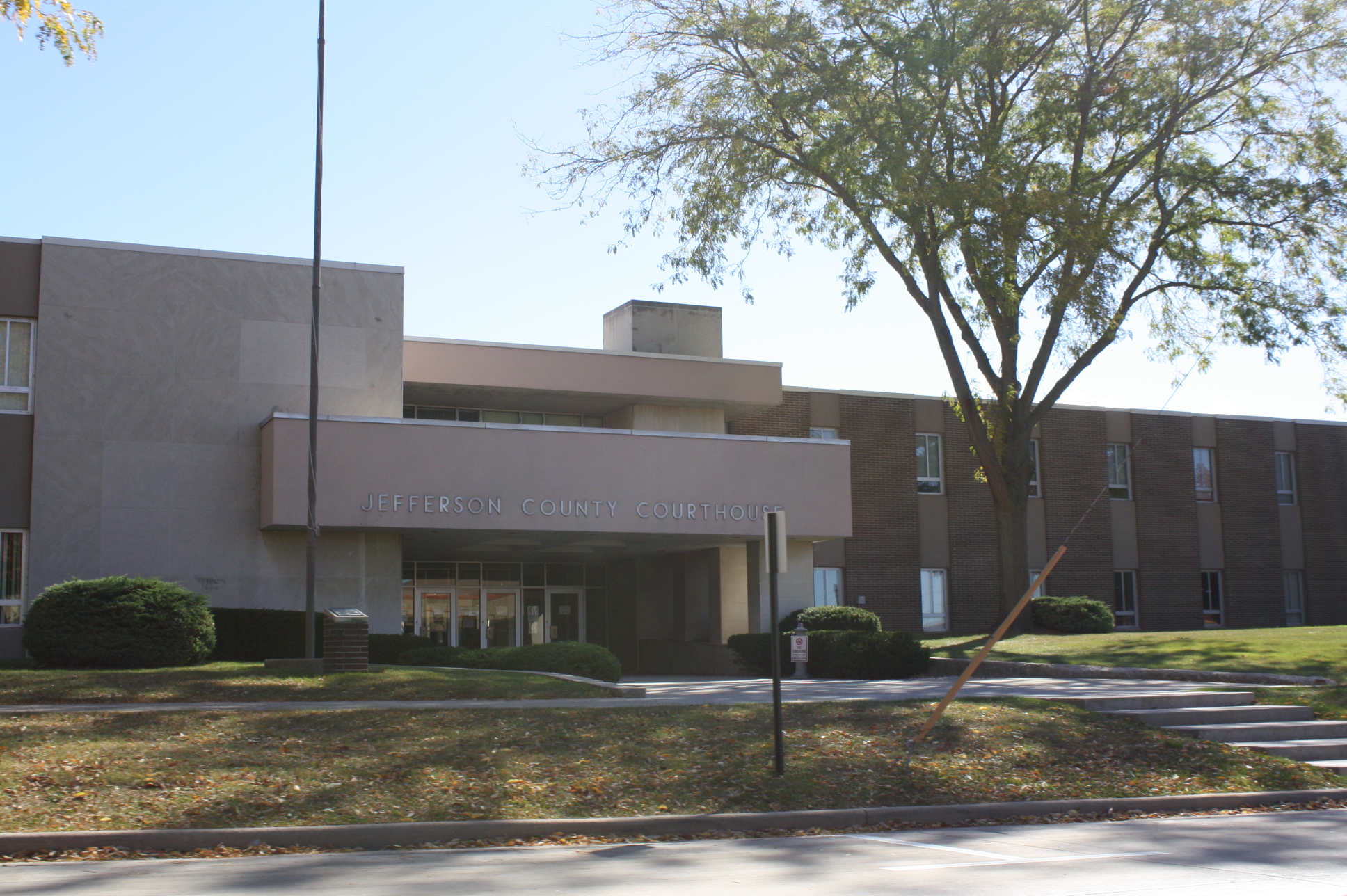
- Jefferson County Courthouse

- Location within the U.S. state of Wisconsin
- Coordinates: 43°01′N 88°47′W
- Country: United States
- State: Wisconsin
- Founded: 1839
- Named for: Thomas Jefferson
- Seat: Jefferson
- Largest city: Watertown

Area
  - Total: 583 sq mi (1,510 km^{2})
  - Land: 556 sq mi (1,440 km^{2})
  - Water: 26 sq mi (67 km^{2}) 4.5%

Population (2020)
  - Total: 84,900
  - Estimate (2025): 86,505 ▲
  - Density: 153/sq mi (59.0/km^{2})
- Time zone: UTC−6 (Central)
  - Summer (DST): UTC−5 (CDT)
- Congressional district: 5th
- Website: www.jeffersoncountywi.gov

Jefferson County is a county in the U.S. state of Wisconsin. As of the 2020 census, the population was 84,900. Its county seat is Jefferson. Jefferson County comprises the Watertown-Fort Atkinson, WI Micropolitan Statistical Area, which is also included in the Milwaukee-Racine-Waukesha, WI Combined Statistical Area.

== History ==
Jefferson County was created in 1836 as part of Wisconsin Territory and was organized in 1839. Jefferson County was founded by "Yankee" settlers from New England. It was named after Jefferson County, New York, where some of the original settlers came from. The town of Watertown was named after Watertown, New York, in Jefferson County.

== Geography ==
Soils of Jefferson County

According to the U.S. Census Bureau, the county has an area of 583 square miles (1,510 km^{2}), of which 556 square miles (1,440 km^{2}) is land and 26 square miles (67 km^{2}) (4.5%) is water.

=== Major highways ===
- Interstate 94
- U.S. Highway 12
- U.S. Highway 18
- Wisconsin Highway 16
- Wisconsin Highway 19
- Wisconsin Highway 26
- Wisconsin Highway 59
- Wisconsin Highway 89
- Wisconsin Highway 106
- Wisconsin Highway 134

=== Railroads ===
- Amtrak
- Canadian Pacific
- Union Pacific
- Wisconsin and Southern Railroad

=== Airports ===
- Watertown Municipal Airport (KRYV) provides services for the county and surrounding communities.
- Fort Atkinson Municipal Airport (61C), enhances county service.

=== Adjacent counties ===
- Dodge County - north
- Waukesha County - east
- Walworth County - southeast
- Rock County - southwest
- Dane County - west

== Demographics ==
Historical population
Census	Pop.	Note	%±
1840	914		—
1850	15,317		1,575.8%
1860	30,438		98.7%
1870	34,040		11.8%
1880	32,156		−5.5%
1890	33,530		4.3%
1900	34,789		3.8%
1910	34,306		−1.4%
1920	35,022		2.1%
1930	36,785		5.0%
1940	38,868		5.7%
1950	43,069		10.8%
1960	50,094		16.3%
1970	60,060		19.9%
1980	66,152		10.1%
1990	67,783		2.5%
2000	74,021		9.2%
2010	83,686		13.1%
2020	84,900		1.5%
2025 (est.)	86,505	▲	1.9%
U.S. Decennial Census; 1790–1960 1900–1990; 1990–2000 2010 2020

=== Racial and ethnic composition ===
Jefferson County, Wisconsin – Racial and ethnic composition Note: the US Census treats Hispanic/Latino as an ethnic category. This table excludes Latinos from the racial categories and assigns them to a separate category. Hispanics/Latinos may be of any race.
Race / Ethnicity (NH = Non-Hispanic)	Pop 1980	Pop 1990	Pop 2000	Pop 2010	Pop 2020	% 1980	% 1990	% 2000	% 2010	% 2020
White alone (NH)	64,761	65,969	69,765	75,903	73,325	97.90%	97.32%	94.25%	90.70%	86.37%
Black or African American alone (NH)	105	188	184	628	864	0.16%	0.28%	0.25%	0.75%	1.02%
Native American or Alaska Native alone (NH)	106	170	216	212	206	0.16%	0.25%	0.29%	0.25%	0.24%
Asian alone (NH)	174	278	323	551	646	0.26%	0.41%	0.44%	0.66%	0.76%
Native Hawaiian or Pacific Islander alone (NH)	x	x	13	13	19	x	x	0.02%	0.02%	0.02%
Other race alone (NH)	117	18	30	57	202	0.18%	0.03%	0.04%	0.07%	0.24%
Mixed race or Multiracial (NH)	x	x	459	767	2,570	x	x	0.62%	0.92%	3.03%
Hispanic or Latino (any race)	889	1,160	3,031	5,555	7,068	1.34%	1.71%	4.09%	6.64%	8.33%
Total	66,152	67,783	74,021	83,686	84,900	100.00%	100.00%	100.00%	100.00%	100.00%

=== 2020 census ===
As of the 2020 census, the county had a population of 84,900, a population density of 152.6 people per square mile (58.9 people/km^{2}), and 36,376 housing units at an average density of 65.4 units per square mile (25.3 units/km^{2}).

The median age was 41.0 years; 21.9% of residents were under the age of 18 and 17.9% were 65 years of age or older. For every 100 females there were 101.1 males, and for every 100 females age 18 and over there were 98.9 males age 18 and over.

There were 33,844 households in the county, of which 28.7% had children under the age of 18 living in them. Of all households, 51.7% were married-couple households, 18.1% were households with a male householder and no spouse or partner present, and 22.2% were households with a female householder and no spouse or partner present. About 26.8% of all households were made up of individuals and 11.5% had someone living alone who was 65 years of age or older.

The racial makeup of the county was 88.5% White, 1.0% Black or African American, 0.4% American Indian and Alaska Native, 0.8% Asian, <0.1% Native Hawaiian and Pacific Islander, 3.4% from some other race, and 5.8% from two or more races. Hispanic or Latino residents of any race comprised 8.3% of the population.

55.5% of residents lived in urban areas, while 44.5% lived in rural areas.

Of the 36,376 housing units, 7.0% were vacant. Among occupied housing units, 71.2% were owner-occupied and 28.8% were renter-occupied. The homeowner vacancy rate was 1.1% and the rental vacancy rate was 4.7%.

2000 Census Age Pyramid for Jefferson County

=== 2010 census ===
As of the census of 2010, there were 83,686 people, 32,117 households, and 21,872 families residing in the county. The population density was 133 people per square mile (51 people/km^{2}). There were 30,092 housing units at an average density of 54 units per square mile (21 units/km^{2}). The county's racial makeup was 96.34% White, 0.28% Black or African American, 0.34% Native American, 0.45% Asian, 0.02% Pacific Islander, 1.65% from other races, and 0.93% from two or more races. 4.09% of the population were Hispanic or Latino of any race. 55.1% were of German, 6.1% Norwegian, 6.0% Irish and 5.1% American ancestry.

There were 28,205 households, out of which 33.20% had children under the age of 18 living with them, 58.50% were married couples living together, 8.20% had a female householder with no husband present, and 29.50% were non-families. 23.60% of all households were made up of individuals, and 9.60% had someone living alone who was 65 years of age or older. The average household size was 2.55 and the average family size was 3.02.

In the county, the population was spread out, with 25.20% under the age of 18, 8.50% from 18 to 24, 30.40% from 25 to 44, 23.20% from 45 to 64, and 12.60% who were 65 years of age or older. The median age was 37 years. For every 100 females there were 98.40 males. For every 100 females age 18 and over, there were 96.80 males.

In 2017, there were 861 births, giving a general fertility rate of 53.7 births per 1000 women aged 15–44, the eleventh lowest rate out of all 72 Wisconsin counties.

The Dwight Foster Public Library, which serves as the resource library for the county, had a total service population of 19,095 in 2010. It is a member of the Bridges Library System.

== Government ==
The County Board of Supervisors, with 30 members, serves as the legislative body for the county. There are seven elected officials in addition to the County Board of Supervisors. County-wide partisan elections are held in November. The County Board's members are elected for two-year terms during a spring non-partisan election. The County Board is responsible for the county administrator. The County Board elects a chairman, vice-chairman, and second vice-chairman.

== Politics ==
United States presidential election results for Jefferson County, Wisconsin
Year	Republican		Democratic		Third party(ies)	
Year	No.	%	No.	%	No.	%
1892	2,679	35.37%	4,661	61.53%	235	3.10%
1896	4,344	52.61%	3,504	42.44%	409	4.95%
1900	3,729	46.25%	4,127	51.18%	207	2.57%
1904	3,669	47.67%	3,778	49.09%	249	3.24%
1908	3,207	40.43%	4,492	56.63%	233	2.94%
1912	1,926	27.43%	4,381	62.40%	714	10.17%
1916	3,785	49.57%	3,645	47.73%	206	2.70%
1920	8,865	80.38%	1,844	16.72%	320	2.90%
1924	4,250	31.22%	1,374	10.09%	7,987	58.68%
1928	8,612	57.29%	6,305	41.94%	116	0.77%
1932	5,062	30.78%	11,230	68.28%	156	0.95%
1936	5,599	32.32%	11,144	64.33%	581	3.35%
1940	10,178	56.02%	7,842	43.16%	149	0.82%
1944	10,245	59.16%	6,988	40.35%	84	0.49%
1948	8,244	52.42%	7,256	46.13%	228	1.45%
1952	13,884	66.93%	6,827	32.91%	32	0.15%
1956	13,357	67.02%	6,452	32.37%	122	0.61%
1960	14,133	61.64%	8,757	38.19%	39	0.17%
1964	8,741	39.58%	13,295	60.20%	48	0.22%
1968	12,478	54.97%	8,716	38.40%	1,504	6.63%
1972	14,621	59.47%	9,303	37.84%	663	2.70%
1976	15,528	53.89%	12,577	43.65%	707	2.45%
1980	16,174	53.91%	11,335	37.78%	2,491	8.30%
1984	17,780	61.77%	10,788	37.48%	216	0.75%
1988	14,309	54.32%	11,816	44.86%	217	0.82%
1992	13,072	39.85%	11,593	35.34%	8,137	24.81%
1996	12,681	42.59%	13,188	44.29%	3,905	13.12%
2000	19,204	53.20%	15,203	42.11%	1,692	4.69%
2004	23,776	56.45%	17,925	42.56%	414	0.98%
2008	21,096	48.87%	21,448	49.69%	622	1.44%
2012	23,517	53.11%	20,158	45.52%	606	1.37%
2016	23,417	54.32%	16,569	38.44%	3,123	7.24%
2020	27,208	56.71%	19,904	41.48%	867	1.81%
2024	28,771	57.37%	20,574	41.03%	801	1.60%

Jefferson County has been primarily Republican since 1940. Only three Democratic presidential candidates have won the county since then, in 1964, 1996, and 2008. Lyndon B. Johnson in 1964 is the last Democratic Party candidate to win a majority of the county's votes.

== Communities ==
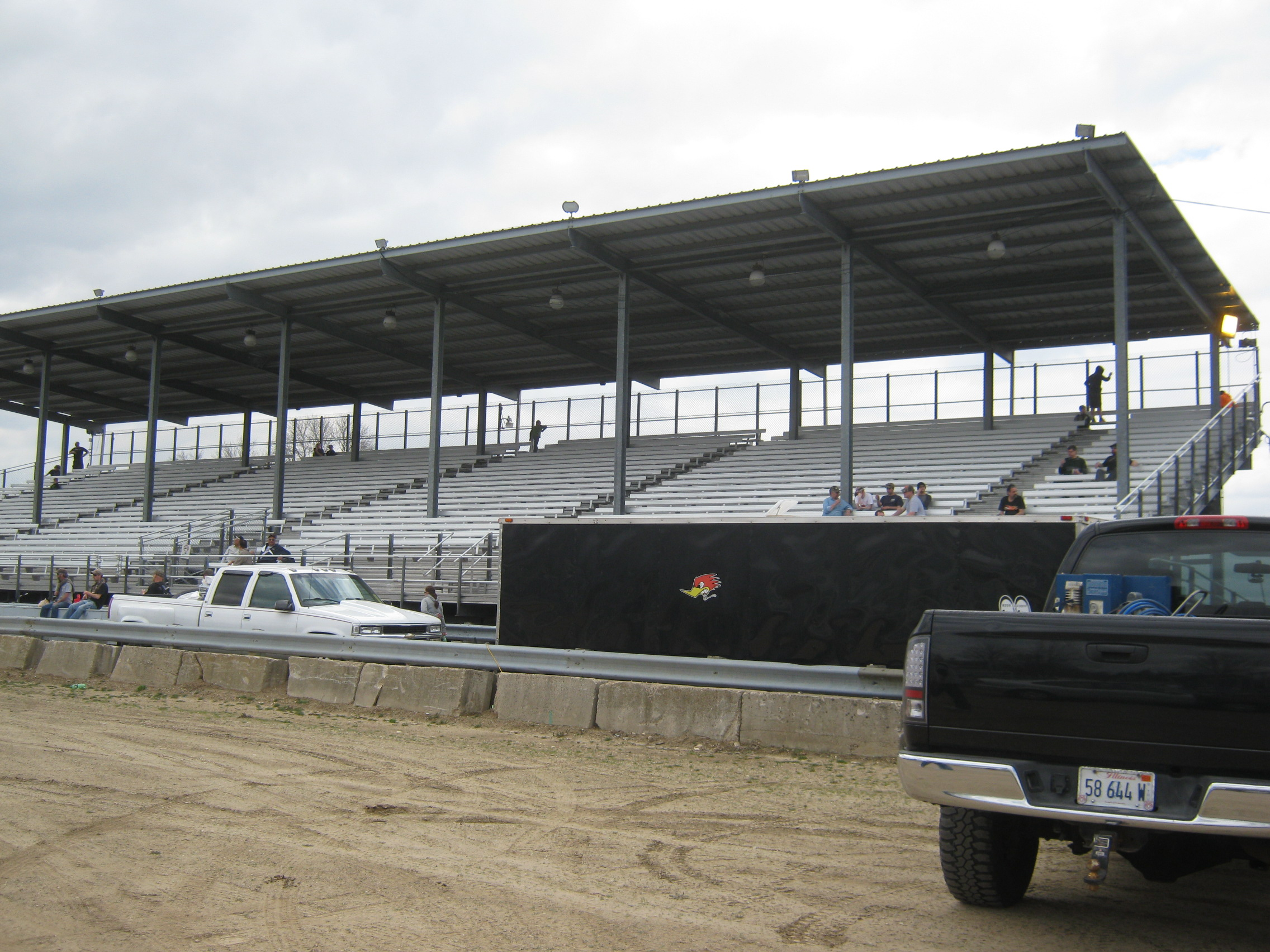
Grandstands at the county fairgrounds in Jefferson

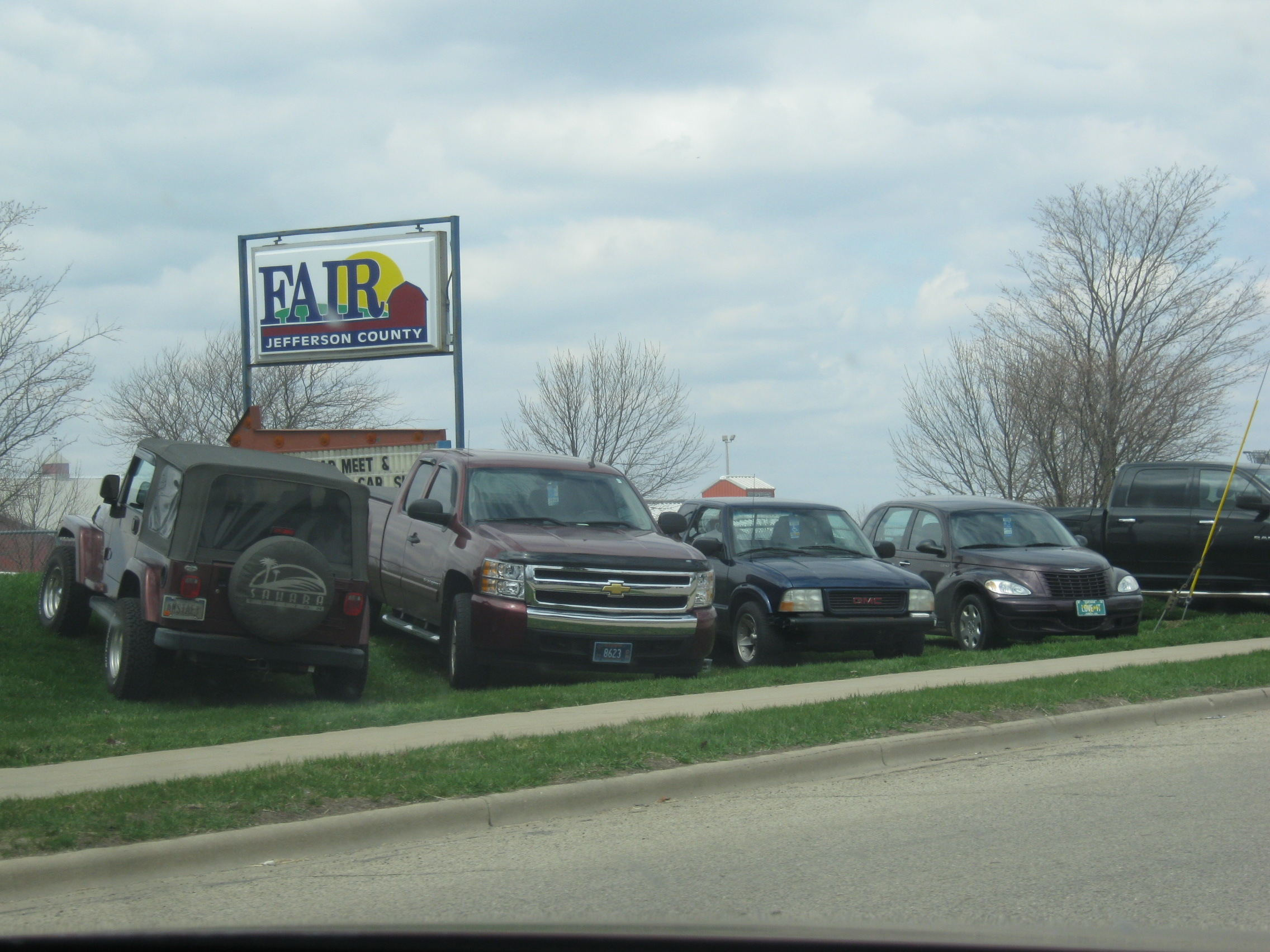
Sign at fairgrounds

=== Cities ===
- Fort Atkinson
- Jefferson (county seat)
- Lake Mills
- Waterloo
- Watertown (partly in Dodge County)
- Whitewater (mostly in Walworth County)

=== Villages ===
- Cambridge (mostly in Dane County)
- Johnson Creek
- Lac La Belle (mostly in Waukesha County)
- Palmyra
- Sullivan

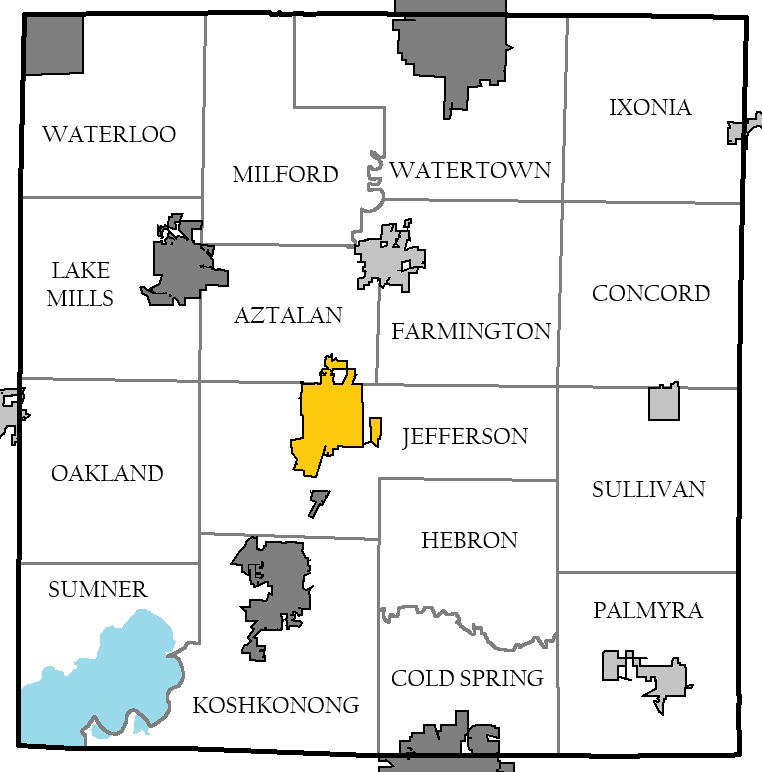
Towns of Jefferson County

=== Towns ===
- Aztalan
- Cold Spring
- Concord
- Farmington
- Hebron
- Ixonia
- Jefferson
- Koshkonong
- Lake Mills
- Milford
- Oakland
- Palmyra
- Sullivan
- Sumner
- Waterloo
- Watertown

=== Census-designated places ===
- Hebron
- Helenville
- Ixonia
- Lake Koshkonong
- Lake Ripley
- Rome

=== Unincorporated communities ===
- Aztalan
- Blackhawk Island
- Busseyville
- Carcajou
- Cold Spring
- Concord
- Ebenezer
- Farmington
- Glenn Oaks Beach
- Heath Mills
- Hoopers Mill
- Hubbleton
- Jefferson Junction
- Koshkonong (partial)
- Koshkonong Manor
- Koshkonong Mounds
- Kroghville
- Lake Lac La Belle
- London (partial)
- Maranatha Baptist University (College Campus)
- Milford
- North Shore
- Oakland
- Pipersville
- Portland (partial)
- Slabtown
- Sylvan Mounds
- Vinnie Ha Ha

== Education ==
School districts (all K-12) include:

- Cambridge School District
- Edgerton School District
- Fort Atkinson School District
- School District of Jefferson
- Johnson Creek School District
- Kettle Moraine School District
- Lake Mills Area School District
- Oconomowoc Area School District
- Palmyra-Eagle Area School District
- Waterloo School District
- Watertown School District
- Whitewater School District

== See also ==
- National Register of Historic Places listings in Jefferson County, Wisconsin
