= Lake Koshkonong =

Lake in southern Wisconsin, U.S.

- Location within Wisconsin Location within the United States
- Location: Jefferson / Rock / Dane counties, Wisconsin, U.S.
- Coordinates: 42°52′27″N 88°57′29″W
- Lake type: Reservoir
- Primary inflows: Rock River
- Primary outflows: Rock River
- Basin countries: United States
- Surface area: 10,460 acres (42 km^{2})
- Average depth: 6 ft (2 m)
- Max. depth: 7 ft (2 m)
- Surface elevation: 774 ft (236 m)

Lake Koshkonong is a reservoir in southern Wisconsin, which was transformed from its original marshland by the construction of the Indianford Dam in 1932. The lake lies along the Rock River, with the river acting as both the primary inflow and the primary outflow for the lake. Lake Koshkonong begins 5.5 mi (8.9 km) downriver from Fort Atkinson, with the large majority of the lake located in southwestern Jefferson County. Small portions of the lake extend into southeastern Dane and northern Rock counties.

After the creation of the Indianford Dam, which was built several miles down the Rock River from Lake Koshkonong, the lake gained a surface area measuring 10,460 acres (42.3 km^{2}). It remains very shallow with an average depth of six feet (1.8 meters) and a maximum depth of seven feet (2.1 meters). The dam itself measures 13 feet (4.0 meters) high and with a length of 500 ft (150 m) at its crest. Maximum capacity of the reservoir is 107,000 acre⋅ft (132,000,000 m^{3}). Both dam and reservoir are owned and operated by Rock County.

== History and etymology ==
The currently accepted spelling "Koshkonong" was first used by James Duane Doty in 1844. An often repeated claim that has been recently disputed is that the meaning of the name is "the lake that we live on". A more accurate approximation may be "where there is heavy fog," or "where it is closed in by fog". Current thinking suggests that the modern spelling is a contraction of various names given to the region by white settlers in the early 19th century. They incorporated various pronunciations of the region from various surrounding tribes, including "Kashkawanung" from the Ojibwe, "Coscahoenah" from the Menominee, and "Kuskouonog" from the Potawatomi. This theory is supported by the fact that these name forms seem to share Algonquian language patterns, despite describing a Ho-Chunk village. More evidence disputing the older name translation is that the name seems to have described a Winnebago village on the shores of the lake, with the name being extended to the body of water at a later date.

This spelling of the lake's name gained legitimacy after surveying efforts in the area codified this interpretation in the 1830s and 40s. Fort Koshkonong, a fort of some importance to the United States during the Black Hawk War, was named in accordance with this convention. The fort was active before the Rock River was dammed, when the area was a cattail marsh with the Rock River running through the middle. Today, the lake borders the towns of Koshkonong on its eastern side and Sumner on its northern side.

== Ecology ==
=== Vegetation ===
Lake Koshkonong has seen many vegetational changes in the past 150 years. Once a deep-water marsh covered with emergent vegetation, the lake was predominantly wetlands filled with reeds, wild rice, and grasses. The wetlands have significantly disappeared since then due to rising water levels caused by higher dams and the ever changing landscape. It is estimated to have lost over 100 acres of wetland by 2000. Now, the large pool of water known as Lake Koshkonong has been replaced by lake sedge (Carex lacustris), bur-reed (Sparganium), and other aquatic species. The lake association has been trying to introduce Pondweed and Wild celery to improve fish habitats.

=== Fish ===
Throughout the Rock River (Mississippi River tributary) and Lake Koshkonong around sixty species of fish can be found. Many of those species are river spawners, meaning the release of gametes from the body occurs in the rivers even though they might spend their whole life in lakes. Floods and droughts will both affect spawning of different species of fish, enhancing the amount of some and depleting others. A few species of fish that can be found in the lake include muskellunge, panfish, largemouth bass, smallmouth bass, northern pike, walleye and catfish.

=== Birds ===
In the surrounding habitats of Lake Koshkonong's riparian wetlands, many endangered species of birds can be found. The rising water levels have an unfortunate impact on these species. Loss of trees, herbaceous vegetation, and groundwater dependent wetland plants will effect the species they support. Some of the rare species found in this area that are impacted by rising water levels and habitat loss are the Cerulean warbler and the Acadian flycatcher. Other rare species of birds that are being affected are Black tern, Forster's tern, American bittern, Least bittern, and Virginia rail.

== Tourism and recreation ==
=== Summer attractions ===
Lake Koshkonong is well known for its great fishing seasons. Hook and line fishing is open all year round with restrictions on some species including Muskellunge, Lake Sturgeon, Trout, Paddlefish, and other endangered species. Muskellunge and Hybrid season for 2020 was open May 2, 2020 to December 31, 2020 with a minimum length limit of 40 inches and a daily bag limit of 1. For fishing to be able to occur on the lake it has to be stocked by the Wisconsin Department of Natural Resources at the Bark River Hatchery in Fort Atkinson with Walleye and Northern pike. There are four boat landings around the lake for people to use and also two beaches. The Lake is very shallow averaging around 6 feet with a maximum depth of 7 feet, but you can still boat, canoe, and kayak here.

Events hosted on the lake range from boat races to Venetian Boat Parades. Thunder on the Lake is a high speed boat race that has been held on Lake Koshkonong. The boats are hydroplane powered and can reach speeds up to 60 MPH. Other boat races are also held for fishing boats, and other smaller boats. The Venetian Boat Parade is put on by the Rock Koshkonong Business Association. Participants are encouraged to dress up their boat with lights and decorations of their choosing and cruise along with one another ending at the Lakeview bar.

=== Winter attractions ===
Ice fishing and ice racing used to be much more common, but due to warmer weather in the past few years the activity has not been as popular. Other winter activities practiced on and around the lake include snowmobiling, fatbike riding, and ice skating.

== Environmental concerns ==
=== Erosion ===
The loss of aquatic plant biodiversity and rising water levels on the lake due to flooding has caused significant erosion over the past 50 years. The shoreline has been impacted greatly by such events, and projects to reverse and prevent more damage from occurring have been done. Riprap armor has been used to prevent future erosion, but it is mostly a short term fix where human made rock formations are placed along the shoreline to protect against scour and waves. In 2002 and 2003 the Rock Koshkonong Lake District (RKLD) teamed up with wetland owners to protect around 40% or almost 5 miles of the shoreline with riprap armor. Incorporating breakwater structures has also been talked about as a potential fix to the erosion problem.

=== Water quality ===
Lake Koshkonong is known for its tinted green color which is caused by algae and nutrient runoff from the Rock River. The lake is classified as hypereutrophic because it is extremely rich in nutrients and the water is shallow. The transparency of the water is low and algal blooms occur frequently, causing this classification. A lake will be classified as hypereutophic if it has more than 40 micrograms/liter of chlorophyll, more than 100 micrograms/liter of phosphorus, and a visibility depth of less than 3 feet. The Trophic State Index scale also helps with these classifications. If a lake scores a TSI of above 50 it will be considered hypereutrophic. Lake Koshkonong has a TSI score of 67. Algal blooms can result in high levels of blue-green algae which can be harmful to humans and pets under certain circumstances. Blue-green algae has been found in parts of Lake Koshkonong. It is advised by the Rock County Public Health Department to not swim in areas with floating green scum, and blue or white paint looking areas that resemble pea soup.

=== Proposed nuclear power plant ===
In the 1970s, Lake Koshkonong was the primary site considered for a billion dollar nuclear power station. Wisconsin Electric Power Company, Wisconsin Power and Light Company, Madison Gas and Electric, and Wisconsin Public Service Corporation jointly proposed the project. They chose Lake Koshkonong out of 84 potential sites because of the solid rock found here that could be used for the foundation, and the Rock River could be used as an adequate water source. In 1974, it was estimated that the utilities would lose $40 million if the two-unit, 900 MW each, facility was not approved. At that time, the timetable had already slipped to a 1983/1984 commissioning. The proposed two pressurized-water reactor system had hopes of beginning construction in 1978.

The plan was met with strong resistance from environmental groups. It was eventually killed in 1977 by concerns regarding the lake's shallow depth and consequences to the plant during drought conditions. Water would have been exiting the lake to cool down the plant, and residents were uneasy about that along with other aspects of the project. The power plant was intended to relocate many residents and disrupt farmland as well. It was estimated that the disruption to farmland would cost farmers a total of $27,500 each year for lost crops.

The Koshkonong Alert Group was an anti-nuclear group that formed in opposition of the power plant.

Attempts were made to salvage the $40 million investment by moving the facility to Haven, Wisconsin, near Sheboygan, but state utilities gave up on their plans for construction of a nuclear station in Wisconsin following the Three Mile Island accident in Pennsylvania. The plant was planned to be built on Vickerman Road, east of the lake and east of Wisconsin Highway 26.(42°51′37″N 88°53′27″W)
