= Watertown Municipal Airport (Wisconsin) =

Airport in Wisconsin, United States

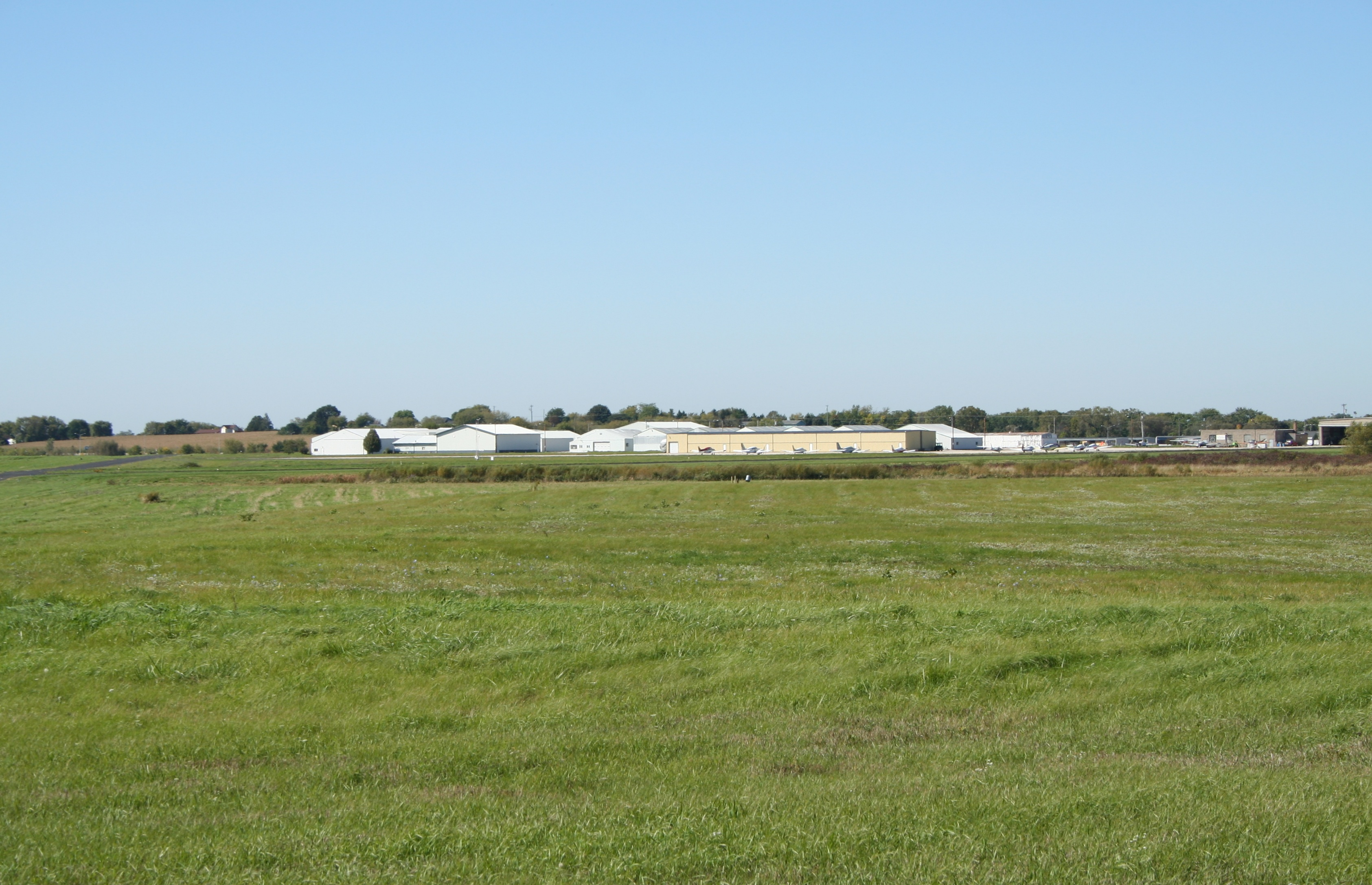
- IATA: none; ICAO: KRYV; FAA LID: RYV

Summary
- Airport type: Public
- Owner: City of Watertown
- Serves: Watertown, Wisconsin
- Opened: December 1945
- Time zone: CST (UTC−06:00)
  - Summer (DST): CDT (UTC−05:00)
- Elevation AMSL: 833 ft (254 m)
- Coordinates: 43°10′11″N 088°43′24″W

Map
- Location of airport in Wisconsin RYV (the United States)

Runways
| Direction | Length | | Surface |
| Direction | ft | m | Surface |
|---|---|---|---|
| 5/23 | 4,429 | 1,350 | Asphalt |
| 11/29 | 2,801 | 854 | Asphalt |

Statistics
- Aircraft operations (2021): 58,000
- Based aircraft (2024): 60
- Source: Federal Aviation Administration

Watertown Municipal Airport (ICAO: KRYV, FAA LID: RYV) is a public use airport located in and owned by the city of Watertown, in Jefferson County, Wisconsin, United States. It is included in the Federal Aviation Administration (FAA) National Plan of Integrated Airport Systems for 2025–2029, in which it is categorized as a regional general aviation facility.

Although most U.S. airports use the same three-letter location identifier for the FAA and IATA, this airport is assigned RYV by the FAA but has no designation from the IATA.

Watertown Municipal Airport was the site of the first Transponder Landing System in the United States.

== Facilities and aircraft ==
Watertown Municipal Airport covers an area of 360 acres (150 ha) at an elevation of 833 feet (254 m) above mean sea level. It has two runways:

- Runway 5/23: 4,429 x 75 ft. (1,350 x 23 m.), surface: asphalt. Approved GPS and NDB approaches.
- Runway 11/29: 2,801 x 75 ft. (854 x 23 m.), surface: asphalt. Approved GPS approaches.

The ROCK RIVER (RYV) non-directional beacon, 371 kHz, is located on the field.

For the 12-month period ending May 24, 2021, the airport had 58,000 aircraft operations, an average of 159 per day: 89% general aviation, 9% air taxi and 2% military. In July 2024, there were 60 aircraft based at this airport: 51 single-engine, 7 multi-engine and 2 jet.

== Aero park ==
There is an aero-park, sponsored by the local Marine League, located adjacent to the airport where air operations can be observed. 43°10′27″N 88°43′3″W

== Gallery ==
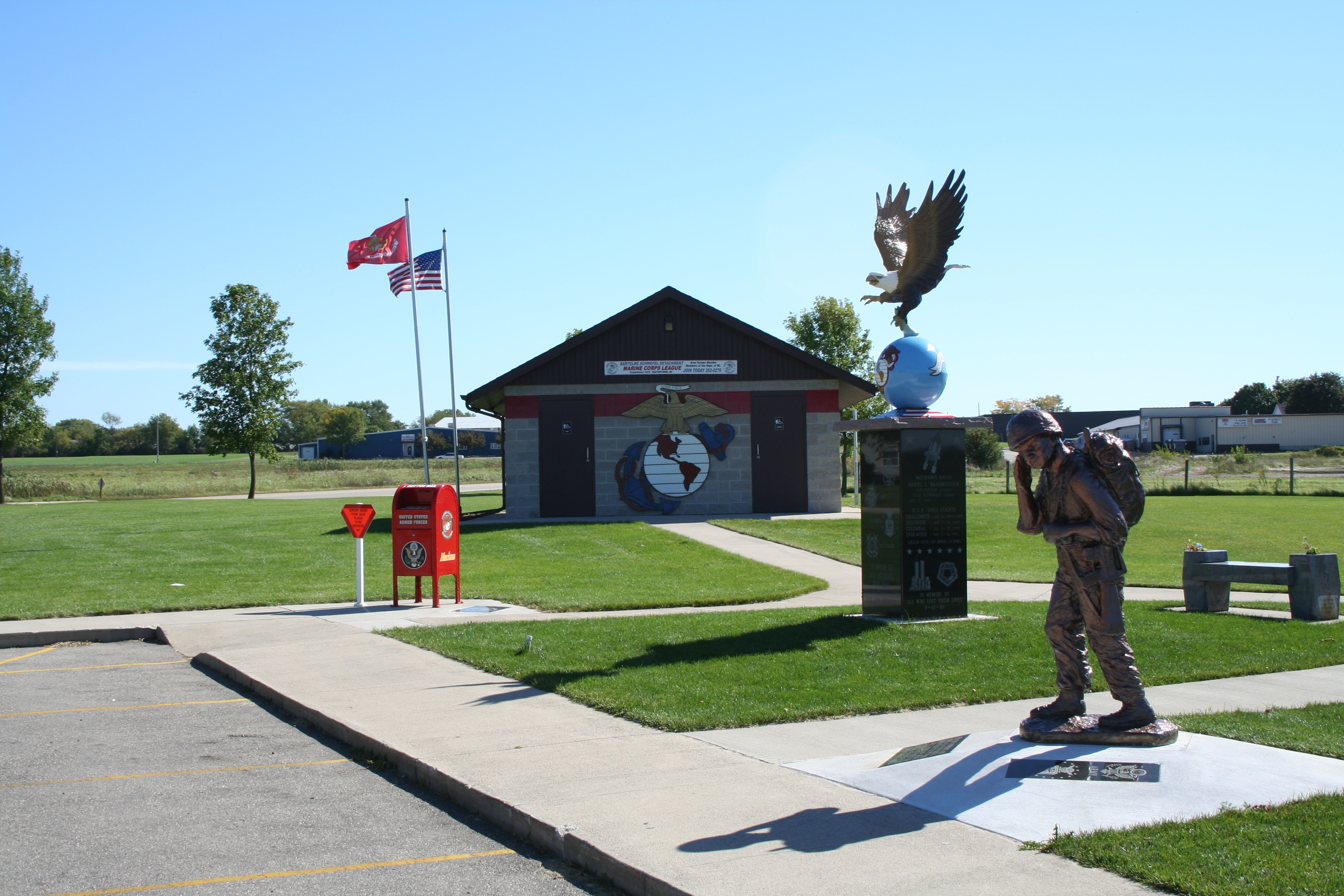
Various monuments at the Marine League Aero Park adjacent to the airport

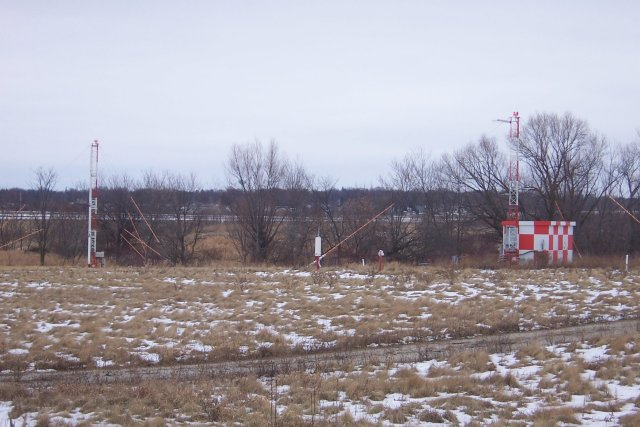
TLS building (right) and elevation receive antenna (left) as seen in December 2005 (TLS equipment was removed prior to September 2007.)

== See also ==
- List of airports in Wisconsin
