= National Register of Historic Places listings in Jefferson County, Wisconsin =

Location of Jefferson County in Wisconsin

This is a list of the National Register of Historic Places listings in Jefferson County, Wisconsin. It is intended to provide a comprehensive listing of entries in the National Register of Historic Places that are located in Jefferson County, Wisconsin. The locations of National Register properties for which the latitude and longitude coordinates are included below may be seen in a map.

There are 61 properties and districts listed on the National Register in the county.

This National Park Service list is complete through NPS recent listings posted November 13, 2026.

== Current listings ==
	Name on the Register	Image	Date listed	Location	City or town	Description
1	Helmut Ajango House		July 11, 2022 (#100007885)	825 East St. 42°55′04″N 88°49′51″W	Fort Atkinson	Contemporary/Wrightian-style house designed by Helmut Ajango for himself, with most of the current look from a 1978 remodel.
2	Aztalan	Aztalan	October 15, 1966 (#66000022)	Near Lake Mills on WI 89, Aztalan State Park; 43°04′03″N 88°51′40″W	Lake Mills	One-time village along the Crawfish River, which had three platform mounds and dwellings surrounded by a large stockade. The village was a northern outpost of Mississippian culture, occupied from around 900 to 1300 CE. Now a state park.
3	Beals and Torrey Shoe Co. Building	Beals and Torrey Shoe Co. Building	December 6, 1984 (#84000699)	100 W. Milwaukee St. 43°11′24″N 88°43′36″W	Watertown	Four-story brick shoe factory built in 1904. Beals and Torrey had the largest payroll in Watertown from 1917 through 1954. The building housed the Kusel Dairy Equipment factory from the 1930s to 1960s. Now apartments.
4	Bean Lake Islands Archeological District	Bean Lake Islands Archeological District	August 12, 1982 (#82000673)	Address Restricted	Lake Mills	
5	Michael and Margaritha Beck Farmstead	Michael and Margaritha Beck Farmstead	February 5, 2018 (#100002092)	W2803 U.S. Route 18; 43°00′20″N 88°49′02″W	Jefferson	Highly intact farm established in 1865 by German immigrants, which made the transition from wheat to dairy. Includes 1880 brick farmhouse, basement barn, milk-house, granary, machine shed, and privy.
6	Brandt House		April 2, 2008 (#08000258)	410 S. 4th St. 43°11′28″N 88°43′20″W	Watertown	
7	Carcajou Point (47 Je 2)	Carcajou Point (47 Je 2)	September 18, 1979 (#79000088)	Address Restricted	Busseyville	Oneota village site on shore of Lake Koshkonong which had houses, burials and refuse pits.
8	Chicago and Northwest Railroad Passenger Station	Chicago and Northwest Railroad Passenger Station	March 28, 1979 (#79000086)	725 W. Main St. 43°11′40″N 88°44′05″W	Watertown	Depot of the C&NW, designed by Charles Sumner Frost in Victorian picturesque style and built of wood in 1903, with separate men's and women's waiting rooms and gas lighting fixtures.
9	City of Waterloo Carousel	City of Waterloo Carousel	August 15, 1997 (#97000890)	500 Park Ave. 43°10′49″N 88°59′05″W	Waterloo	Two-row, country style, portable merry-go-round with hand-carved jumping horses, built in 1911 by C.W. Parker Amusement Co. of Leavenworth and now located at Firemen's Park. Submerged in the 2008 flood of the Maunesha River. Restored by 2011 and moved to higher ground.
10	Clyman Street Historic District	Clyman Street Historic District	August 3, 2015 (#15000503)	Roughly bounded by Western Ave,. Clyman, S. 10th & S. 5th Sts. 43°11′14″N 88°43′06″W	Watertown	Well-to-do neighborhood with various styles, including the 1855 Italianate Prentiss house, the 1861 Greek Revival Gamm house, 1865 Gothic Revival Smith house, the 1876 gabled ell Ford house, the 1898 Queen Anne Schulz house, the 1906 Craftsman Meyer house, the 1907 Georgian Revival Wertheimer house, the 1907 Neoclassical King house, the 1913 Dutch Colonial Revival Lehman house, the 1914 American Foursquare Mollart house, the 1919 Prairie School Nowack house, and the 1928 Colonial Revival Meadows house.
11	Copeland-Ryder Company	Copeland-Ryder Company	April 13, 1989 (#89000233)	411 Wisconsin Dr. 43°00′06″N 88°48′46″W	Jefferson	Brick shoe factory complex, displaying utilitarian-industrial design. George Copeland and son-in-law Lewis Ryder started Jefferson Boot and Shoe in the late 1860s, mechanizing early and expanding. Oldest remaining buildings are from 1885, 1895, etc. In 1900, C-R was the largest manufacturer in Jefferson. Sold to Dr. Scholl's in 1946 and closed in 1977. Now remodeled as apartments.
12	David W. and Jane Curtis House	David W. and Jane Curtis House	May 12, 2009 (#09000309)	213 E. Sherman Ave. 42°55′48″N 88°50′04″W	Fort Atkinson	Very intact Queen Anne-styled house and matching carriage house built in 1885. David invented a butter churn and sold dairy equipment.
13	Crab Apple Point Site	Crab Apple Point Site	December 22, 1978 (#78000104)	Address Restricted	Edgerton	Another Oneota village site on shore of Lake Koshkonong. Later, Ho-Chunk people lived there during historic times.
14	Enterprise Building	Enterprise Building	June 5, 1975 (#75000068)	125 W. Main St. 42°52′40″N 88°35′06″W	Palmyra	2-story commercial building built in the late 1840s, with cobblestone front, limestone quoins, and fieldstone sides. Originally housed a store, then Oliver Dow's Palmyra Enterprise for many years.
15	Enoch J. Fargo House	Enoch J. Fargo House	July 8, 1982 (#82000674)	406 Mulberry St. 43°04′53″N 88°54′27″W	Lake Mills	3-story cream brick Queen Anne-styled home designed by Enoch himself and probably Paul Henningson and built 1893-96, with a porte-cochère, a 2.5 story carriage house, and a corner tower topped with a lantern. Now a B&B.
16	L. D. Fargo Public Library	L. D. Fargo Public Library	January 18, 1982 (#82000675)	120 E. Madison St. 43°04′51″N 88°54′38″W	Lake Mills	1899-1902, Gothic revival style with fieldstone walls, elaborate bargeboards, and storybook elements, designed by George B. Ferry & Alfred C. Clas with stonework by L.A. Giles.
17	First Kindergarten	First Kindergarten	February 23, 1972 (#72000055)	919 Charles St. 43°11′04″N 88°42′26″W	Watertown	Building which housed the first kindergarten in the U.S., started by German exile Margarethe Schurz in 1856.
18	Fort Atkinson Club	Fort Atkinson Club	April 24, 2017 (#100000923)	211 S. Water St. E 42°55′39″N 88°50′04″W	Fort Atkinson	Private clubhouse designed by Charles Fitzgerald in Craftsman style and built in 1912, with card room, billiard room, dining room, gym and bowling alley. Housed a Masonic lodge from the 1930s to 90s.
19	Fort Atkinson Water Tower	Fort Atkinson Water Tower	November 15, 2005 (#05001298)	S. High and Fourth Sts. 42°55′33″N 88°49′58″W	Fort Atkinson	Early municipal water tower, with a 78-foot brick base supporting a 33-foot steel tank. The agreement to build it in 1901 was a landmark in the development of utilities in Fort Atkinson.
20	August and Eliza Fuermann Jr. House	August and Eliza Fuermann Jr. House	July 27, 1989 (#89001002)	500 S. Third St. 43°11′28″N 88°43′23″W	Watertown	2.5-story cream brick Queen Anne-styled house, built in 1893. August worked in his family's Empire Brewery. Local milliner Clara Weiss lived in the house from 1893 to 1933.
21	Haight Creek Mound Group (47-Je-38)	Haight Creek Mound Group (47-Je-38)	August 5, 1985 (#85001751)	Address Restricted	Fort Atkinson	
22	Hebron Town Hall	Hebron Town Hall	December 31, 2002 (#02001666)	W3087 Green Isle Dr. 42°55′31″N 88°41′19″W	Hebron	Highly intact 2-story town hall designed in simple Classical Revival style with a pediment in each gable end, built in 1902 by the Pollock Brothers and local residents. Now a museum.
23	Highsmith Site	Highsmith Site	December 1, 1978 (#78000106)	Northeast of Fort Atkinson	Fort Atkinson	
24	Hoard Mound Group (47JE33)		May 10, 1984 (#84003678)	Address Restricted	Fort Atkinson	Group of effigy mounds at the Koshkonong Mounds Country Club.
25	Hoard's Dairyman Farm	Hoard's Dairyman Farm	August 29, 1978 (#78000105)	N of Fort Atkinson; 42°56′48″N 88°50′12″W	Fort Atkinson	Dairy farm complex used as a lab since 1899 to test new ideas for the journal Hoard's Dairyman, like alfalfa as feed, and single-purpose dairy cows.
26	Arthur R. Hoard House	Arthur R. Hoard House	November 30, 1982 (#82001845)	323 Merchants Ave. 42°55′28″N 88°50′07″W	Fort Atkinson	2-story Italianate-styled house built around 1860 for George Marston, storekeeper and brewer. Later owned by several prominent families, including Arthur R. Hoard of Hoard's Dairyman, who added Queen Anne elements to the house.
27	Jefferson Fire Station	Jefferson Fire Station	December 6, 1984 (#84000695)	146 E. Milwaukee St. 43°00′15″N 88°48′22″W	Jefferson	The 2-story main block with yellow Watertown brick and Italianate styling was designed by Alexander Kirkland and built in 1871. Adam Spangler designed a complementary expansion and the hose-drying tower, which were added in 1876.
28	Jefferson High School	Jefferson High School	January 11, 2001 (#00001643)	201 S. Copeland Ave. 43°00′15″N 88°48′45″W	Jefferson	Two-story brick school designed in Collegiate Gothic style by Van Ryn & DeGelleke and Jefferson native Julius Heimerl, and built 1924-25. The 1953 addition was designed by Foeller, Schober, Berners, Safford and Jahn of Green Bay.
29	Jefferson Public Library	Jefferson Public Library	January 17, 1980 (#80000142)	305 S. Main St. 43°00′12″N 88°48′27″W	Jefferson	Carnegie library designed by Claude and Starck in Prairie School style with characteristic horizontal lines and ribbon windows and built in 1911.
30	Jones Dairy Farm	Jones Dairy Farm	December 27, 1978 (#78000107)	Jones Ave. 42°55′22″N 88°50′45″W	Fort Atkinson	Farm complex begun in the 1840s by Vermonter, pioneer and civic leader Milo Jones. When son Milo C. Jones developed arthritis in 1889 he tried making and selling sausage, which has grown into a successful meat-processing business.
31	Knapp-Calkins Farmstead	Knapp-Calkins Farmstead	October 29, 2018 (#100003061)	W1420 WI 59; 42°52′43″N 88°36′24″W	Palmyra	Includes large Italianate house with cupola, built in 1860, and several barns, silos, and a granary.
32	Lake Mills Downtown Commercial Historic District	Lake Mills Downtown Commercial Historic District	April 5, 2019 (#100003634)	102-131 E. Lake, 113-203 W. Lake, 103-211 N. Main & 101-202 S. Main Sts. 43°04′47″N 88°54′45″W	Lake Mills	38 historic buildings in the old downtown, including the 1854 Kaltenbrun and Bruns hardware store and tin shop, the 1876 commercial vernacular-style Foote building, 1881 Joeckel building, the 1883/1899 German Renaissance Revival-styled Greenwood's State Bank, the 1890 Neupert Blacksmith shop, the 1890 Gericke Brothers building, the 1891 Yandre Brothers livery, the 1892 Fargo Dairy Supply building, the 1893 Queen Anne-styled Fargo block, the 1895 Richardsonian Romanesque Williams block, the 1900 Klein Wagon Shop, the 1903 Dodge Creamery office building, the 1907 Fargo building, the 1921 Neoclassical-styled Greenwood's State Bank. the 1923 20th-Century Commercial-styled Luetzow Meat Market, and the 1931 Lake Mills Shoe Factory.
33	Loewe-Weis-Wilson Farm		March 21, 2024 (#100010116)	504 East Main Street; 42°52′52″N 88°34′49″W	Palmyra	Farm begun in 1870 by German immigrant Victor Loewe and wife Antionette, who started the Italianate-style house in 1872 and began selling drinking water from a spring on the farm, which led to Palmyra becoming a mineral springs resort. Later owned by William Weis, who ran a wholesale liquor business in Milwaukee, operated the farm as a dairy with Jersey cattle, and added many of the outbuildings around 1910. Woodrow and Gertrude Wilson bought the farm in 1950 and developed their own line of Holsteins there.
34	Main Street Commercial Historic District	Main Street Commercial Historic District	June 2, 1989 (#89000483)	Roughly Main St. from N. Washington St. to S. Seventh St. 43°11′40″N 88°43′23″W	Watertown	Watertown's old downtown with 127 contributing buildings, including the 1855 Commercial Vernacular Johnson Drug Store, the 1855 Italianate Dennis Block, the 1858 Italianate Misegades Wagon Works, the 1876 Queen Anne/Romanesque Platz and Brandt dry goods Store, and the 1907 Neoclassical Public Library.
35	Main Street Commercial Historic District	Main Street Commercial Historic District	January 7, 1998 (#97001627)	Roughly bounded by Dodge St., Center Ave., Mechanic St., and Rock R. 43°00′17″N 88°48′26″W	Jefferson	Jefferson's old downtown, including the 1860 Jefferson House hotel, the 1869/1907 Neuer Saloon/Sample room, the 1884 Italianate Beinfang Block, the 1892 Queen Anne Fisher Building, the 1896 Gothic Revival Stoppenbach Meat Market, the eclectic 1902 Jefferson County Bank, the 1911-12 Neoclassical Farmers & Merchants Bank, the 1914 Craftsman-style C&NW Depot, and the 1930 Art Deco Ziegler Garage.
36	Main Street Historic District	Main Street Historic District	June 7, 1984 (#84003683)	Roughly Main St. from Sherman Ave. to S. 3rd St. 42°55′41″N 88°50′15″W	Fort Atkinson	Fort Atkinson's old downtown, including the 1857 Italianate-styled Albert Winslow Grocery, the 1886 Dr. L.C. Bicknell Building (at left in photo), the 1894 Queen Anne-styled Andra saloon, the 1908 W.D. Hoard Publishing Co., and the 1929 Neoclassical Municipal Building.
37	Eli May House	Eli May House	September 14, 1972 (#72000056)	407 E. Milwaukee Ave. 42°55′37″N 88°49′52″W	Fort Atkinson	The site where Fort Koshkonong (later named Fort Atkinson) was built during the Black Hawk War in 1832. In 1864 May built his elegant 2.5 story cream brick house on the site. May was a teacher, farmer, developer, banker and philanthropist.
38	Monroe McKenzie House	Monroe McKenzie House	June 19, 1985 (#85001360)	226 Main St. 42°52′38″N 88°35′10″W	Palmyra	Greek Revival-styled house with walls of poured grout and a wooden cornice, built in 1846, which is early for concrete construction. McKenzie and his three boarders manufactured boots and shoes.
39	Merchants Avenue Historic District	Merchants Avenue Historic District	June 13, 1986 (#86001303)	Roughly bounded by S. Third St. E and S. Milwaukee Ave. E, Foster St., Whitewater, and Merchant Aves. 42°55′27″N 88°50′06″W	Fort Atkinson	Residential neighborhood of large homes centered on Merchants Ave., including the 1841 Greek Revival-styled Foster house, the 1855 Gothic Revival Craig house, the 1861 Second Empire Winslow house, the 1871 Italianate Ganong house, the 1908 Queen Anne Vickery house, and the 1928 Spanish Colonial Revival St. Peter's Episcopal Church.
40	Mulberry Street Residential Historic District	Mulberry Street Residential Historic District	June 7, 2019 (#100004027)	205 Oak St., 310-425 Mulberry St., 512 Mulberry St. 43°04′54″N 88°54′29″W	Lake Mills	Cluster of 10 large-scale historic homes, including the 1853 Italianate-styled Griswold house, the 1877 Second Empire-styled Frank Fargo house, the 1893 Queen Anne Earl house, and the 1897 Queen Anne Rev. Zimmerman house.
41	Lorine Niedecker Cottage	Lorine Niedecker Cottage	February 20, 2018 (#100002106)	W7307 Blackhawk Island Rd. 42°53′54″N 88°53′43″W	Sumner	Small, simple cottage clad in vertical logs on Blackhawk Island, where Objectivist poet Lorine Niedecker lived in isolation and did some of her writing.
42	North Washington Street Historic District	North Washington Street Historic District	October 23, 2009 (#09000850)	N. Church St. generally bounded by O'Connell and N. Green St., N. Washington St. bounded by O'Connell and Elm Sts. 43°11′51″N 88°43′44″W	Watertown	Residential neighborhood west of the Rock River, including the 1870 Italianate-styled Kusel house, the 1877 Second Empire Dr. Cody house, the 1890 Queen Anne Hartig house, the 1915 Craftsman Calhoun house, the 1925 Maerzke bungalow, the 1929 Dutch Colonial Revival Kreuziger house, and the 1930 Tudor Revival Salick house.
43	Octagon House	Octagon House	November 23, 1971 (#71000039)	919 Charles St. 43°11′05″N 88°42′27″W	Watertown	3-story Italianate-styled brick octagon house with cupola and central spiral staircase, designed and built in 1854 by John Richards, pioneer attorney.
44	Palmyra Boy Scout Cabin	Palmyra Boy Scout Cabin	November 6, 2017 (#100001784)	105 N. 1st St. 42°52′43″N 88°35′05″W	Palmyra	Meeting hall of local Boy Scouts, built 1935-1937 by fathers of scouts and volunteers. Constructed of tamarack logs cut from Jolliffes' and Williams' swamps.
45	Panther Intaglio Effigy Mound	Panther Intaglio Effigy Mound	October 15, 1970 (#70000035)	Address Restricted	Fort Atkinson	A reverse mound scooped out in the shape of a water spirit, along the Rock River - the only known remaining intaglio effigy mound.
46	Pioneer Aztalan Site	Pioneer Aztalan Site	February 25, 1975 (#75000069)	SE corner at jct. of SR B and Sr Q 43°04′19″N 88°51′38″W	Aztalan	Site of Jefferson County's first incorporated village, settled in 1836, but largely abandoned by 1900 because it was bypassed by the railroads. The only remaining original building is the 1852 Greek Revival Baptist church. Several historic cabins have been moved in from elsewhere for the museum.
47	Pitzner Site (47 Je 676)	Pitzner Site (47 Je 676)	July 6, 1982 (#82000676)	Address Restricted	Jefferson	
48	Puerner Block-Breunig's Brewery	Puerner Block-Breunig's Brewery	June 14, 1984 (#84003687)	101-115 E. Racine, 110-112 N. Main St. 43°00′18″N 88°49′09″W	Jefferson	Four Italianate-styled buildings with party walls and elaborate brickwork, including James Barr's 1850 dry goods store which was the first brick store in Jefferson, Jacob Breunig's 1863 brewery and commercial block, and Nicholas Jung's dry goods store. Much of this was bought by Andreas Puerner in 1892 and developed into a department store which lasted in various forms until 1978. Brewery destroyed by fire in 1997. Another building is gone. The 2 remain buildings have unknown historical integrity. The photo is of the wrong building.
49	Richards Hill Residential Historic District	Richards Hill Residential Historic District	June 14, 2013 (#13000403)	Roughly bounded by Western, Richards, Thomas & Harvey Aves., Livsey Pl. & Charles St. 43°11′08″N 88°42′34″W	Watertown	Neighborhood that grew around John Richard's Octagon House, including the 1853 Plank Road Toll House Barn, the 1856 Gothic Revival Smith house, the 1870 Federal-style Winkenwerder house, the 1908 Queen Anne Jaeger house, the 1911 American Foursquare King house, the 1911 Dutch Colonial Revival Koepsel house, the 1915 Richards bungalow, the 1922 English Cottage-style Abelmann house, the 1930 Tudor Revival Keppler house, and the 1934 French Provincial Zimmerman house.
50	Saint Bernard's Church Complex	Saint Bernard's Church Complex	November 26, 2003 (#03001221)	100 and 108 S. Church St. and 111 S. Montgomery St. 43°11′39″N 88°43′44″W	Watertown	High Victorian Gothic church with 210-foot steeple, designed by Patrick Keely and built in 1872 by the largely Irish parish. Also an 1883 rectory and 1892 church school.
51	Albert and Mary Shekey House	Albert and Mary Shekey House	July 7, 2015 (#15000404)	W7526 Koshkonong Mounds Rd. 42°52′33″N 88°54′21″W	Koshkonong	Highly-intact 2.5-story Queen Anne-styled farmhouse built in 1885, with unusual Dutch gable ends.
52	Richard C. Smith House	Richard C. Smith House	April 19, 1979 (#79000338)	332 E. Linden St. 43°00′08″N 88°48′07″W	Jefferson	Late, modest Frank Lloyd Wright Usonian house, designed around a large oak tree, and built in 1950.
53	Albert F. Solliday House	Albert F. Solliday House	December 5, 2003 (#03001249)	114 S. Church St. 43°11′38″N 88°43′44″W	Watertown	2.5-story Queen Anne house built 1892-93, with Shingle styling in the gables, Richardsonian Romanesque round arches in the porte cochere, and a 3-story octagonal tower. Built for Albert A. Solliday, a Civil War vet, prominent dentist and mayor of Watertown. Now St. Bernard's Rectory. South Main Street Residential Historic District, 226-275 South Main St., 307-354 South Main St., Lake Mills, RS100004026, LISTED, 4/20/2020
54	South Main Street Residential Historic District	South Main Street Residential Historic District	April 20, 2020 (#100004026)	226-275 South Main St., 307-354 South Main St. 43°04′35″N 88°54′49″W	Lake Mills	
55	South Washington Street Historic District	South Washington Street Historic District	November 26, 2003 (#03001220)	Odd numbered 201-309 S. Church St. and S. Washington St. from Emmet St. to West St. 43°11′30″N 88°43′41″W	Watertown	Neighborhood of large, stylish old houses, including the ca 1860 Federal-style Harte house, the 1876 Second Empire Mulberger and Jesse Stone houses, the 1890 Queen Anne Parks house, the 1903 American Foursquare Kusel house, the 1910 Craftsman Hafemeister house, the 1878/1915 Georgian Revival Racek-Parks house, and the 1937 Colonial Revival Cassanova house.
56	St. Paul's Episcopal Church	St. Paul's Episcopal Church	November 7, 1979 (#79000087)	413 S 2nd St. 43°11′29″N 88°43′24″W	Watertown	Episcopal church complex, with 1859 Gothic Revival-style nave, and other later buildings showing variations on that style.
57	St. Wenceslaus Roman Catholic Church	St. Wenceslaus Roman Catholic Church	May 12, 1975 (#75000070)	SE of Waterloo at jct. of Blue Joint and Island Church Rds. 43°09′40″N 88°55′16″W	Waterloo	Rural Catholic church built of tamarack logs about 1863 by Bohemian and German farmers on an island of high ground in the Blue Joint Marsh.
58	Schweiger Industries Plant III	Schweiger Industries Plant III	October 22, 2018 (#100003046)	138 W Candise St. 43°00′26″N 88°48′32″W	Jefferson	Furniture factory built in 1916 and expanded in the 60s and 70s. In the 70s, Schweiger was the third-largest furniture maker in the U.S.
59	Emil and Flora Stoppenbach House	Emil and Flora Stoppenbach House	November 5, 2019 (#100004596)	207 East Racine St. 43°00′19″N 88°48′19″W	Jefferson	2.5-story Queen Anne-styled house with round corner turret, designed by Van Ryn, Andree & Lesser and built in 1893 by Frank Greve of Watertown for Emil Stoppenbach. Stoppenbach was a founder of the C. Stoppenbach & Sons packing plant.
60	Telfer Site	Telfer Site	March 29, 2000 (#00000316)	Address Restricted	Milford	
61	Waterloo Downtown Historic District	Waterloo Downtown Historic District	November 8, 2000 (#00001360)	Jct. of Madison and Monroe Sts. 43°11′02″N 88°59′25″W	Waterloo	The old downtown of Waterloo, including the 1874 Italianate-styled Muebus & Fiebeger's Double Block, the 1885 Brandner dry goods store, the 1893 Queen Anne-styled Doering Block, the 1896 Becken's Saloon, the 1897 Failinger general store, the 1923 Neoclassical Community Hall, the 1924 Colonial Revival-ish Stoke Brothers Auto Filling Station, and the 1938 Arte Moderne Mode Theater.

== See also ==
- List of National Historic Landmarks in Wisconsin
- National Register of Historic Places listings in Wisconsin
- Listings in neighboring counties: Dane, Dodge, Rock, Walworth, Waukesha
