= Beck House =

Beck House may refer to:

== United Kingdom ==
- Beck House, Giggleswick, North Yorkshire, in England

== United States ==
(sorted by state, then city/town)

- William King Beck House, Camden, Alabama, listed on the National Register of Historic Places (NRHP) in Wilcox County
- Smith-Beck House, Benson, Arizona, listed on the NRHP in Cochise County
- Albert Beck House, Boise, Idaho, listed on the NRHP in Ada County
- Waldron-Beck House and Carriage House, Lafayette, Indiana, listed on the NRHP in Tippecanoe County
- James A. Beck House, Fairfield, Iowa, listed on the NRHP in Jefferson County
- Chief Justice Joseph M. Beck House, Fort Madison, Iowa, listed on the NRHP in Lee County
- James Burnie Beck House, Lexington, Kentucky, listed on the NRHP in Fayette County
- Klir Beck House, Mt. Vernon, Maine, listed on the NRHP in Kennebec County
- Beck-Warren House, Cambridge, Massachusetts, listed on the NRHP in Middlesex County
- Beck House (Vicksburg, Mississippi), listed on the NRHP in Warren County
- Alice Beck Cabin, Lake McDonald, Montana, listed on the NRHP in Flathead County
- Samuel Beck House, Portsmouth, New Hampshire, listed on the NRHP in Rockingham County
- Beck House (Sunbury, Pennsylvania), listed on the NRHP in Northumberland County
- Frederick Beck Farm, San Angelo, Texas, listed on the NRHP in Tom Green County
- Reid Beck House, Draper, Utah, listed on the NRHP in Salt Lake County
- Michael and Margaritha Beck Farmstead, Jefferson, Wisconsin, listed on the NRHP in Jefferson County

== See also ==
- Beck Houses, village in Cumbria, England
