= Main Street Commercial Historic District =

Main Street Commercial Historic District or Main Street Commercial District or Main Street Historic Commercial District may refer to:

- Main Street Commercial District (Dothan, Alabama), a historic district listed on the National Register of Historic Places (NRHP) in Houston County, Alabama
- Main Street Commercial District (Little Rock, Arkansas), a historic district listed on the NRHP in Pulaski County, Arkansas
- Main Street Historic Commercial District (Point Arena, California), NRHP-listed in Mendocino County
- Main Street Commercial District (Georgetown, Kentucky), a historic district listed on the NRHP in Scott County, Kentucky
  - Main Street Historic Commercial District (Georgetown, Kentucky), a boundary increase to that
- Main Street Commercial Historic District (Kalispell, Montana), listed on the NRHP in Flathead County, Montana
- Main Street Commercial Historic District (Hamlet, North Carolina), listed on the NRHP in Richmond County, North Carolina
- Main Street Commercial Historic District (Jefferson, Wisconsin), listed on the NRHP in Jefferson County, Wisconsin
- Main Street Commercial Historic District (Platteville, Wisconsin), listed on the NRHP in Grant County, Wisconsin
- Main Street Commercial Historic District (Reedsburg, Wisconsin), listed on the NRHP in Sauk County, Wisconsin
- Stoughton Main Street Commercial Historic District, Stoughton, Wisconsin, listed on the NRHP in Dane County, Wisconsin
- Main Street Commercial Historic District (Watertown, Wisconsin), listed on the NRHP in Jefferson County, Wisconsin

== See also ==
- Main Street Historic District (disambiguation)
