= Jefferson Public Library =

Jefferson Public Library may refer to:

- Jefferson Public Library (Jefferson, Iowa), listed on the National Register of Historic Places in Greene County, Iowa
- Jefferson Public Library (Jefferson, Wisconsin), listed on the National Register of Historic Places in Jefferson County, Wisconsin
- Jefferson Public Library, a part of the Piedmont Regional Library System
- The Library of Congress, which began with the donation of Thomas Jefferson's private library.
