= St. Wenceslas Church =

St. Wenceslas Church or St. Wenceslaus Church may refer to:

== Czech Republic ==
- St. Wenceslas Church (Vršovice) in Prague (District Prague 10), completed in 1930.
- St. Wenceslas Church (Zderaz) in New Town, Prague, first mentioned in 1115.

== United States ==
- St. Wenceslaus Church, Chicago in Chicago, Illinois
- St. Wenceslaus Church, Baltimore in Baltimore, Maryland
- Church of St. Wenceslaus (New Prague, Minnesota)
- St. Wenceslaus Catholic Church and Parish House in Tabor, South Dakota
- St. Wenceslaus Church, Wisconsin in Waterloo, Wisconsin
