= Joseph Stoppenbach =

American politician

Joseph Stoppenbach (March 19, 1862 – August 7, 1944) was an American businessman and politician.

Born in Jefferson, Wisconsin, Stoppenbach was in the malt and meat packing business. Stoppenbach served on the school board and was a Democrat. In 1891, Stoppenbach served in the Wisconsin State Assembly. He died at his daughter's home in Jefferson, Wisconsin.
