= Christopher Grimm (politician) =

American politician

Christpher Grimm (March 18, 1828 – April 20, 1895) was an American businessman and politician.

Grimm was born in Halenbrunn, Kingdom of Bavaria and went to school in Bavaria. In 1846, he emigrated to the United States and settled in Terre Haute, Indiana. In 1865, he moved to Jefferson, Jefferson County, Wisconsin. Grimm was a merchant in Jefferson. Grimm was involved with the Democratic Party. He served as president of the village of Jefferson and as the chairman of the town board. Grimm served on the Jefferson County Board of Supervisors and was the commissioner of public debts. He served in the Wisconsin Assembly in 1893 and 1894. Grimm died suddenly at his home in Jefferson, Wisconsin.
