= Alice Beck Cabin =

Historic house in Montana, United States

- Beck, Alice, Cabin
- U.S. National Register of Historic Places
- Location within Montana Location within the United States
- Location: S. of Kelly's Camp Rd., E. of McDonald Creek., Glacier National Park, Lake McDonald, Montana
- Coordinates: 48°37′51″N 113°52′5″W
- Area: less than one acre
- Built: 1910
- Architectural style: Rustic
- MPS: Recreational Camps on Lake McDonald, MT
- NRHP reference No.: 08001219
- Added to NRHP: December 26, 2008

The Alice Beck Cabin, also known as the John T. Robinson Cabin, is a recreational cabin on the eastern shore of Lake McDonald in Glacier National Park, Montana. The cabin was built around the year 1910, which was the same time that a number of other summer camps were built, and was also prior to the establishment of the park itself. Once the park was designated, the cabin has remained as a private inholding.

== History ==
The Beck property was originally part of a homestead developed in the 1890s by Denis and Lydia Comeau, who had 164 acres (66 ha) near the top of Lake McDonald. Denis Comeau was a sawyer in the winter. The Comeaus sold the parcel that would become the Beck camp to John Robinson in 1905. After their divorce a couple of years later, Denis Comeau left for British Columbia and Lydia subdivided more of her land. The cabin on the Robinson property was built about 1910, possibly by Edward Cruger, who built other similar cabins in the area. The cabin was unoccupied in the 1920s and 1930s, and as such, children from neighboring camps called it the "haunted cabin." The National Park Service, which was buying properties on the lake for the park, did not acquire the Robinson property, and the heir of John Robinson sold it in 1941 to O.M. Junkind. It then passed to Alice Beck, who sold it to Eugene and Luella Fox in 1950. Fox descendants continue to own the property.

== Description ==
The Beck Cabin is a 1 1/2-story peeled log cabin with a screened porch across the side facing the lake under the extended front gable. It was expanded by framed additions in 1965 and 1975. The interior consists of a main room facing the lake with a sleeping loft above along the back wall. The kitchen is at the back. The additions contain bedrooms.

The Beck Cabin was placed on the National Register of Historic Places on December 26, 2008.
