= George Grimm =

American lawyer and judge (1859–1945)

The Honorable George Grimm

Wisconsin Circuit Court Judge for the 12th Circuit
- In office January 1, 1907 – January 1, 1937
- Preceded by: Benjamin F. Dunwiddle
- Succeeded by: Jesse Earle

Member of the Wisconsin State Assembly from the Jefferson 2nd district
- In office January 1, 1887 – January 1, 1889
- Preceded by: Samuel A. Craig
- Succeeded by: Mark Curtis

Personal details
- Born: September 11, 1859 Jefferson, Wisconsin
- Died: October 19, 1945 (aged 86) Jefferson, Wisconsin
- Cause of death: Stroke
- Resting place: Union Cemetery; Jefferson, Wisconsin
- Party: Republican
- Spouses: Mariette Bullock; (died 1944)
- Children: Meta M. (Lacey)^{(b. 1887; died 1976)}
- Parents: Adam Grimm (father); Anna (Thoma) Grimm (mother)
- Education: Northwestern College; University of Michigan Law School

George Grimm (September 11, 1859 – October 19, 1945) was an American judge, lawyer, and politician. He was a Wisconsin Circuit Court Judge for 30 years and served one term in the Wisconsin State Assembly

== Biography ==
Grimm was born in Jefferson, Jefferson County, Wisconsin. He went to Jefferson Liberal Institute and to Northwestern College in Watertown, Wisconsin. In 1879, Grimm received his law degree from University of Michigan Law School and was admitted to the Wisconsin bar. He practiced law in Jefferson, Wisconsin and was involved with farming and beekeeping. Grimm served in the Wisconsin State Assembly in 1887 and was a Republican. Grimm served as a Wisconsin Circuit Court judge for Jefferson County from 1907 to 1937. Grimm died from a stroke at his home in Jefferson, Wisconsin.

== Notes ==
Political offices
Preceded by Samuel A. Craig	Member of the Wisconsin State Assembly from the Jefferson 2nd district 1887 – 1889	Succeeded by Mark Curtis
Legal offices
Preceded by Benjamin F. Dunwiddle	Wisconsin Circuit Court Judge for the 12th Circuit; 1907 – 1937	Succeeded by Jesse Earle
