= Paul M. Blayney =

American Coast Guard admiral

Paul M. Blayney is a retired United States Coast Guard Rear Admiral.

== Early life and education ==
Blayney was born in Milwaukee, Wisconsin and was raised in Jefferson, Wisconsin. He obtained a J.D. from the Columbus School of Law in 1972.

Blayney married Mary Saccardi in 1971.

== Career ==
Blayney graduated from the United States Coast Guard Academy in 1965. From 1998 to 2001, he held command of the Thirteenth Coast Guard District and retired from this position. Others positions he has held include Chief Counsel at Coast Guard Headquarters in Washington, D.C., Commander of the Greater Antilles Section, Special Trial Attorney with the Admiralty and Shipping Section of the United States Department of Justice. He has served as a cutter and patrol boat commander and is a graduate of the Armed Forces Staff College.

Awards he received include the Coast Guard Distinguished Service Medal, the Legion of Merit, the Bronze Star Medal with combat valor device, and the Meritorious Service Medal with oak leaf cluster.
