= Main Street Historic Commercial District (Point Arena, California) =

Historic district in California, United States

- U.S. National Register of Historic Places
- U.S. Historic district
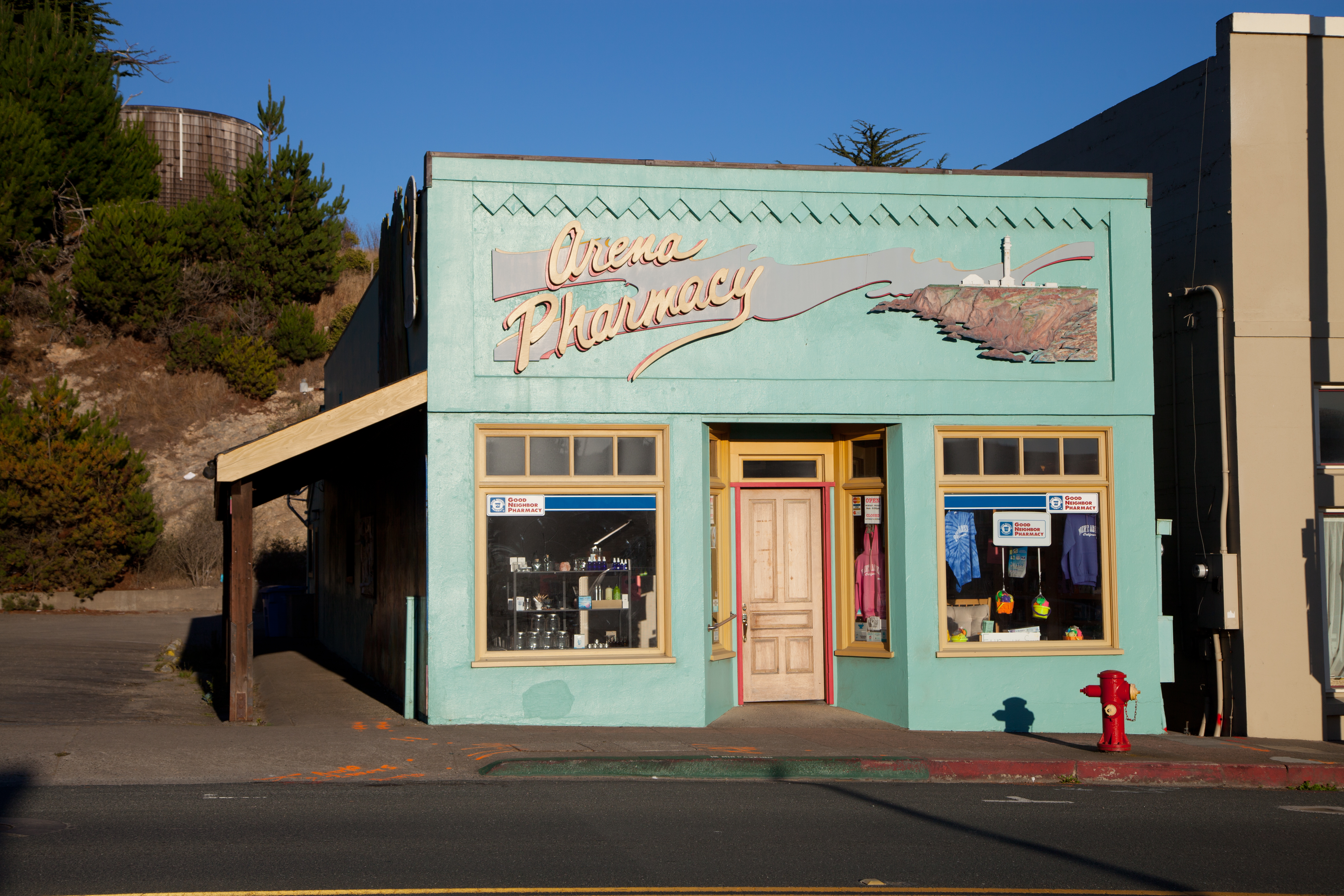

- Location within California Location within the United States
- Location: 165--265 Main St., Point Arena, California
- Coordinates: 38°54′35″N 123°41′29″W
- Area: 4 acres (1.6 ha)
- MPS: Point Arena MPS
- NRHP reference No.: 90001364
- Added to NRHP: September 13, 1990

The Main Street Historic Commercial District in Point Arena, California is a 4-acre (1.6 ha) historic district that was listed on the National Register of Historic Places in 1990. It included 21 contributing buildings.
