= Lake McDonald, Montana =

- Unincorporated community
- Location within Montana Location within the United States
- Coordinates: 48°37′15″N 113°52′18″W
- Country: United States
- State: Montana
- County: Flathead
- Elevation: 3,225 ft (983 m)
- Time zone: UTC-7 (Mountain (MST))
  - Summer (DST): UTC-6 (MDT)
- ZIP code: 59921
- Area code: 406
- GNIS feature ID: 785919

Lake McDonald is an unincorporated Flathead County, Montana, United States community. The community is located on the northeastern shore of Lake McDonald in Glacier National Park.

Before 1878, the lake was known as Terry Lake, after Gen. Alfred Terry. The National Park Service formalized the name of Lake McDonald.
