= Monroe McKenzie House =

Historic house in Wisconsin, United States

- U.S. National Register of Historic Places
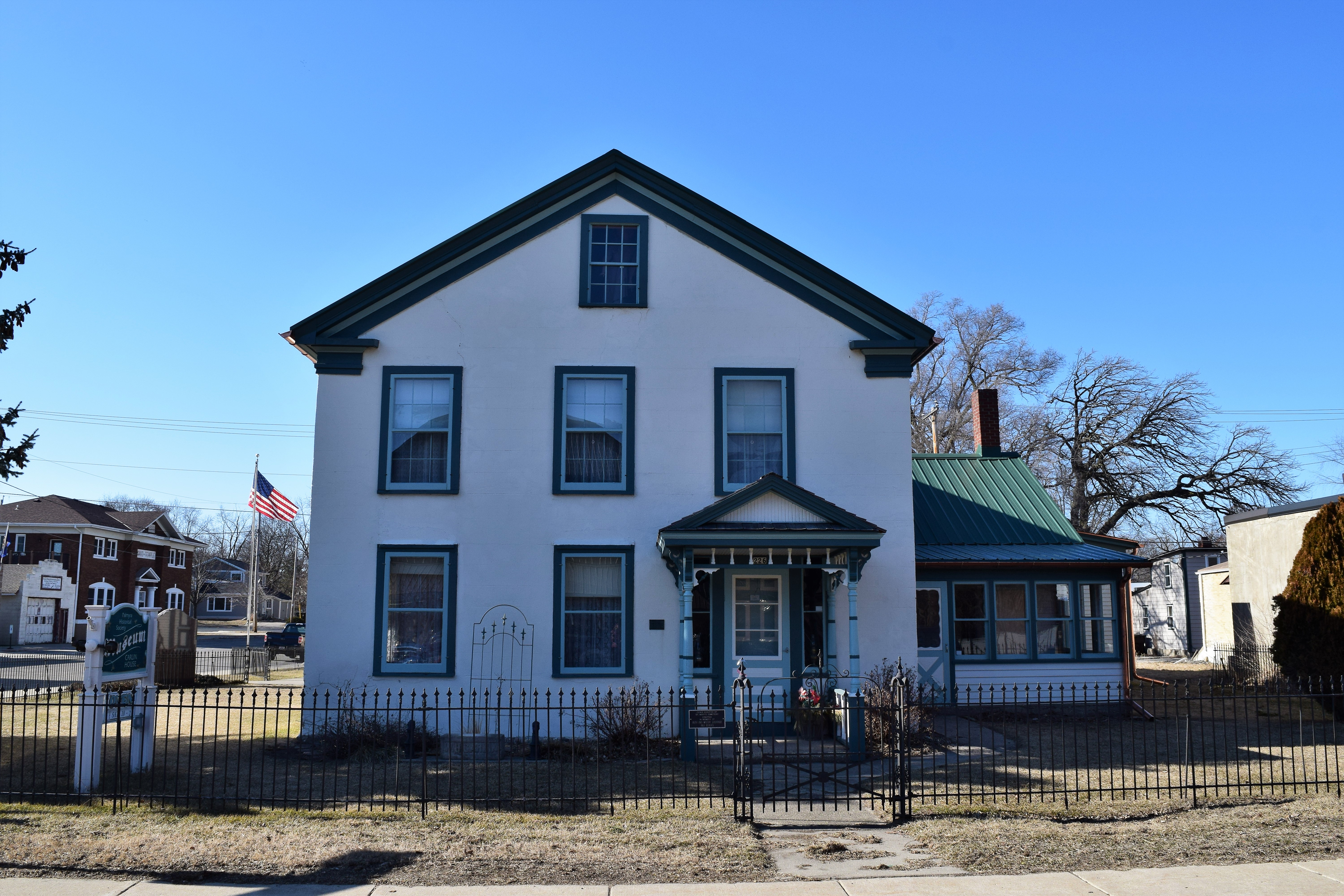
- Monroe McKenzie House
- Location: 226 Main St., Palmyra, Wisconsin
- Coordinates: 42°52′38″N 88°35′10″W
- Area: less than one acre
- Built: 1845
- Architectural style: Greek Revival
- NRHP reference No.: 85001360
- Added to NRHP: June 19, 1985

The Monroe McKenzie House is located in Palmyra, Wisconsin.

== History ==
McKenzie was a boot and shoe manufacture who also served as a justice of the peace. The house is one of the earliest examples of a concrete structures in the United States. Currently, the Palmyra Historical Society uses it as a museum. It was listed on the National Register of Historic Places in 1985 and on the State Register of Historic Places in 1989.
