= Jefferson Public Library (Jefferson, Wisconsin) =

- U.S. National Register of Historic Places
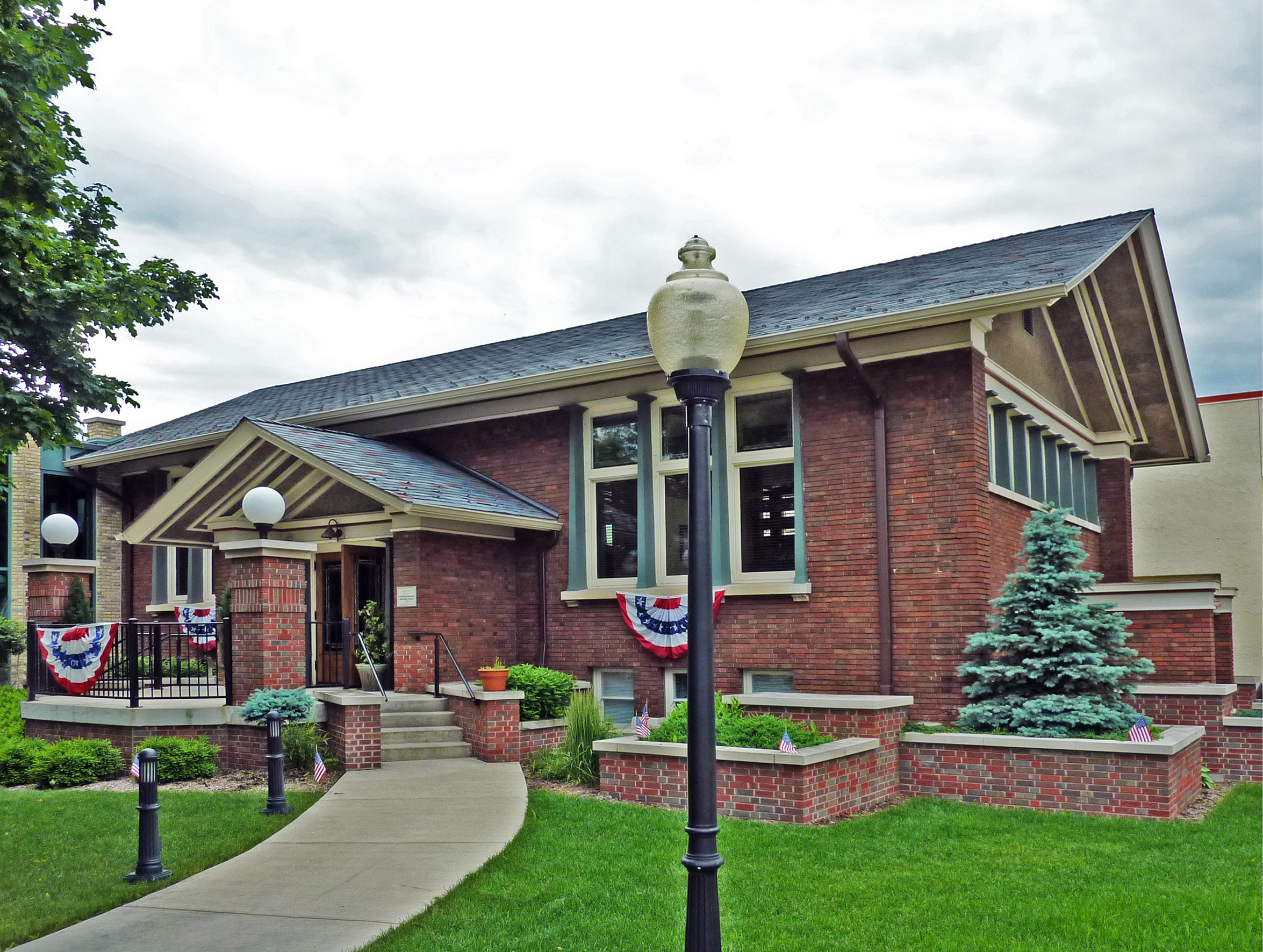
- Jefferson Public Library

- Location within Wisconsin
- Location: 305 S. Main St., Jefferson, Wisconsin
- Coordinates: 43°00′12″N 88°48′27″W
- Area: 0.2 acres (0.081 ha)
- Built: 1911
- Architect: Claude and Starck
- Architectural style: Prairie School
- NRHP reference No.: 80000142
- Added to NRHP: January 17, 1980

The Jefferson Public Library is a historic Carnegie library building at 305 S. Main Street in Jefferson, Wisconsin.

== History ==
The library was built in 1911 through a $10,000 grant from the Carnegie Foundation. Architects Claude and Starck of Madison designed the Prairie School building. The one-story building has a brick exterior with an entrance topped by a large overhanging roof, rows of windows on each end, and a low gable roof with wide eaves. It has been identified as one of the best-preserved examples of a Prairie School library building in Wisconsin.

The building is currently used by the Council for Performing Arts for offices. It was listed on the National Register of Historic Places in 1980 and on the State Register of Historic Places in 1989.
