= Palmyra, Wisconsin =

- Village
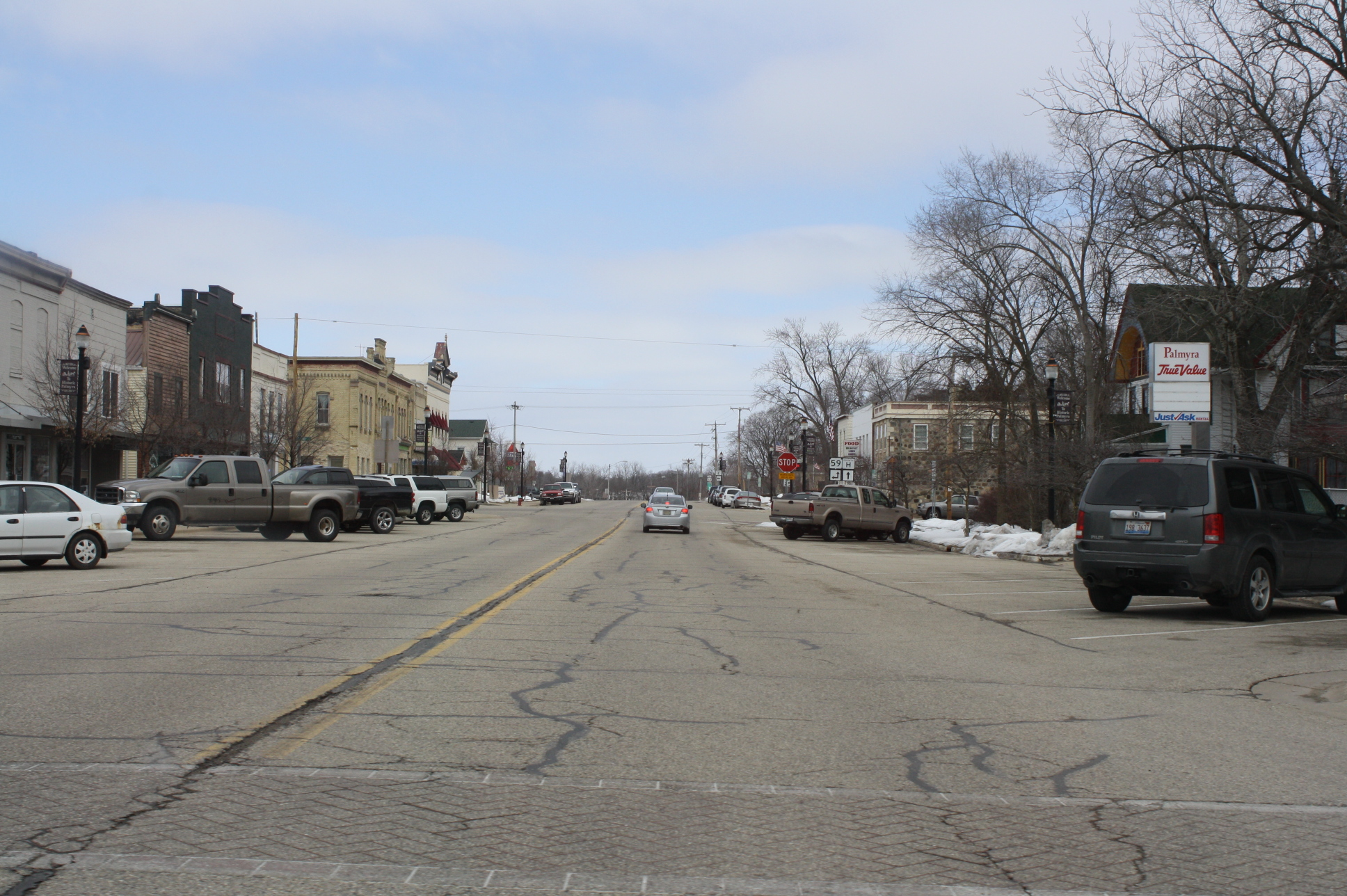
- Looking east at downtown Palmyra

- Location of Palmyra in Jefferson County, Wisconsin.
- Coordinates: 42°52′46″N 88°35′54″W
- Country: United States
- State: Wisconsin
- County: Jefferson

Government
  - Type: Village Board (President - Trustees)
  - President: Kathy Weiss

Area
  - Total: 2.20 sq mi (5.71 km^{2})
  - Land: 2.15 sq mi (5.58 km^{2})
  - Water: 0.050 sq mi (0.13 km^{2})
- Elevation: 850 ft (260 m)

Population (2020)
  - Total: 1,719
  - Density: 815.5/sq mi (314.86/km^{2})
- Time zone: UTC-6 (Central (CST))
  - Summer (DST): UTC-5 (CDT)
- Area code: 262
- GNIS feature ID: 1571003
- Website: www.villageofpalmyra.com

Palmyra is a village in Jefferson County, Wisconsin, United States, along the Scuppernong River. It was named after Palmyra, Syria. The population was 1,719 at the 2020 census. The village is adjacent to the Town of Palmyra.

== History ==
The Town of Palmyra was established in 1846. In 1876, part of the Town of Palmyra was incorporated as the village of Palmyra.

Palmyra was known for its mineral springs. The Palmyra Springs Sanitarium was established in 1870, situated on what is known today as Lower Spring Lake. The sanitarium was a substantially built four-story brick structure containing spacious halls, wide verandas, and modern health and wellness accessories. The building contained facilities for the administration of various forms of electro-shock massage. The rooms were spacious and luxuriously furnished, providing a variety of salt, shower, shampoo, natural mineral, Turkish, and Russian style baths. There was a large gymnasium, theater, music hall, billiard parlors, bowling alleys, archery and tennis courts. The surrounding forty-acre forest of native oaks was referred to as the Sanitarium Grove - today part of the Southern Kettle Moraine State Forest - which contained winding pedestrian paths and resting nooks. The sanitarium was one and half miles from a large spring known by name as the Aurelian Spring, the Great Geyser Spring, or the Big Blue Spring. It was 50 feet across, 38 feet deep, with a flow of clear crystal-blue water that was believed to have therapeutic remedial value. A dam and spillway was later built downstream of the Great Geyer Spring, forming what is today known as Blue Spring Lake. In 1924, the sanitarium became the Druggist's National Home, a home for aged and infirm druggists, but a few years later, interest in the therapeutic mineral treatments declined and the facility was closed. In the late 1950s, the building was razed and the land leveled.

== Geography ==
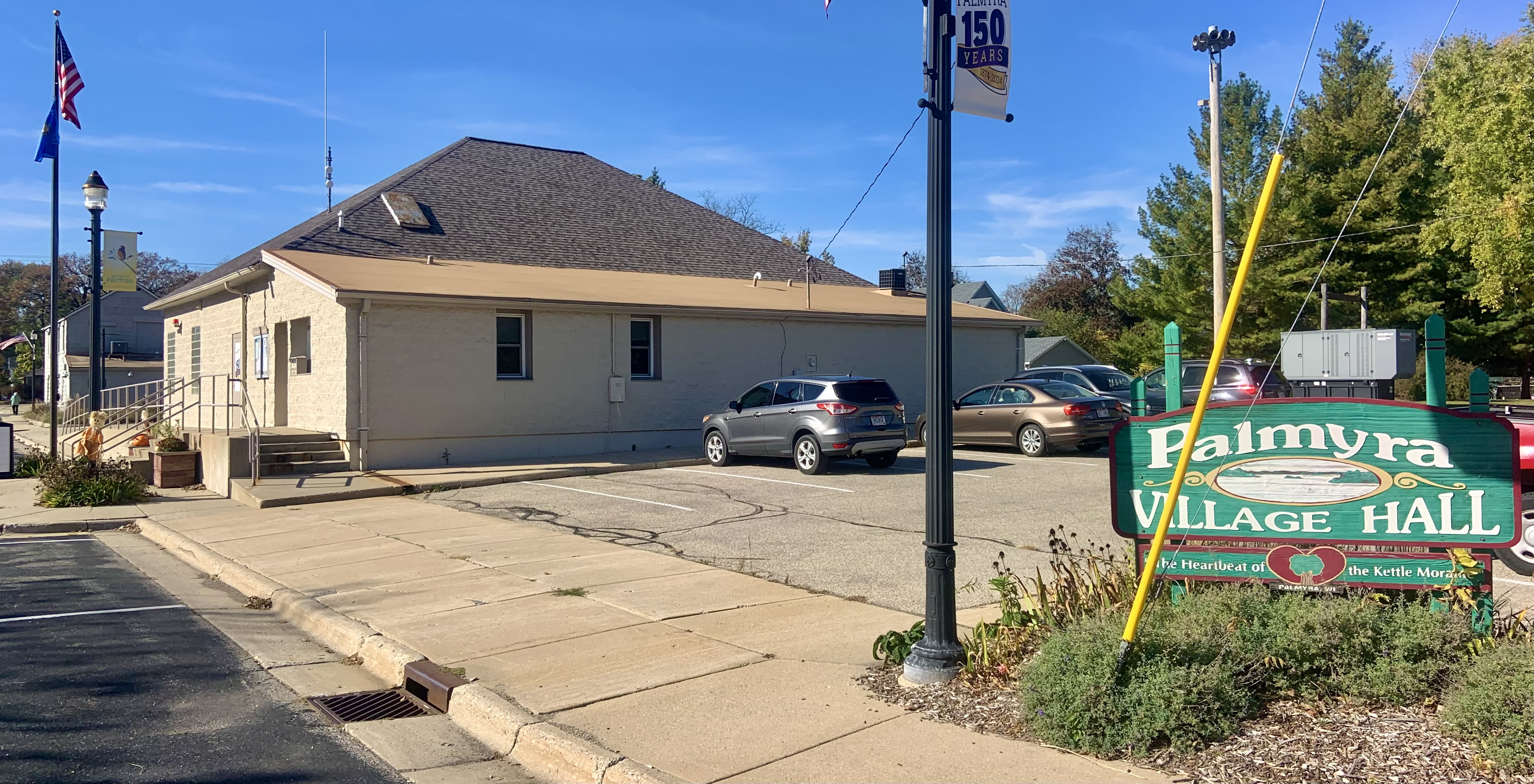
Palmyra Village Hall

Palmyra is located at 42°52′37″N 88°35′13″W (42.87721, -88.587117).

According to the United States Census Bureau, the village has a total area of 1.25 square miles (3.24 km^{2}), of which 1.20 square miles (3.11 km^{2}) is land and 0.05 square miles (0.13 km^{2}) is water.

== Demographics ==
As of 2000 the median income for a household in the village was $45,521, and the median income for a family was $50,192. Males had a median income of $37,150 versus $24,950 for females. The per capita income for the village was $19,849. About 3.4% of families and 5.4% of the population were below the poverty line, including 6.0% of those under age 18 and 4.7% of those age 65 or over.

Historical population
Census	Pop.	Note	%±
1870	703		—
1880	598		−14.9%
1890	567		−5.2%
1900	716		26.3%
1910	649		−9.4%
1920	685		5.5%
1930	642		−6.3%
1940	711		10.7%
1950	862		21.2%
1960	1,000		16.0%
1970	1,341		34.1%
1980	1,515		13.0%
1990	1,540		1.7%
2000	1,766		14.7%
2010	1,781		0.8%
2020	1,719		−3.5%
U.S. Decennial Census

=== 2010 census ===
As of the census of 2010, there were 1,781 people, 704 households, and 469 families residing in the village. The population density was 1,484.2 inhabitants per square mile (573.1/km^{2}). There were 769 housing units at an average density of 640.8 per square mile (247.4/km^{2}). The racial makeup of the village was 94.7% White, 0.6% African American, 0.5% Native American, 0.2% Asian, 3.2% from other races, and 0.8% from two or more races. Hispanic or Latino of any race were 10.3% of the population.

There were 704 households, of which 35.1% had children under the age of 18 living with them, 51.0% were married couples living together, 10.4% had a female householder with no husband present, 5.3% had a male householder with no wife present, and 33.4% were non-families. 26.3% of all households were made up of individuals, and 10.9% had someone living alone who was 65 years of age or older. The average household size was 2.53 and the average family size was 3.04.

The median age in the village was 37.2 years. 25.4% of residents were under the age of 18; 8.7% were between the ages of 18 and 24; 26.9% were from 25 to 44; 26% were from 45 to 64; and 12.9% were 65 years of age or older. The gender makeup of the village was 49.9% male and 50.1% female.

== Notable people ==
- Hiram J. Ball, farmer and Wisconsin state legislator
- Justin Beaver, college football player for the University of Wisconsin-Whitewater
- Gary Congdon, racing driver
- Susan Hawk, Survivor, Season One, Borneo
- Adoniram J. Holmes, congressman from Iowa
- Knute Nelson, U.S. senator from Minnesota
- Iva Bigelow Weaver, soprano and music educator based in Milwaukee
- Frederick L. Wieseman, U.S. Marine Lieutenant general

== Images ==
Looking Northeast at 2nd & taft.

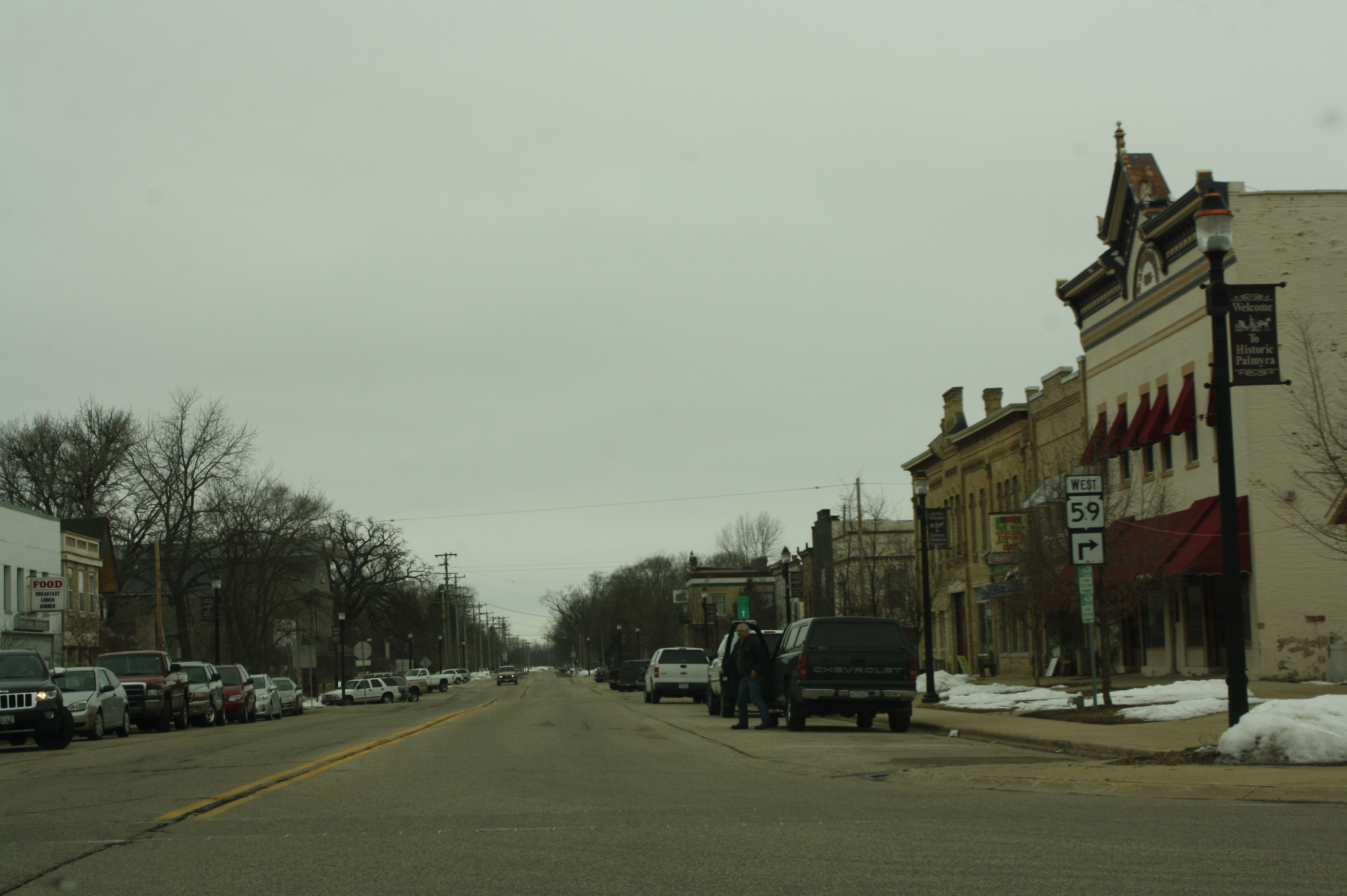
Looking west at downtown Palmyra

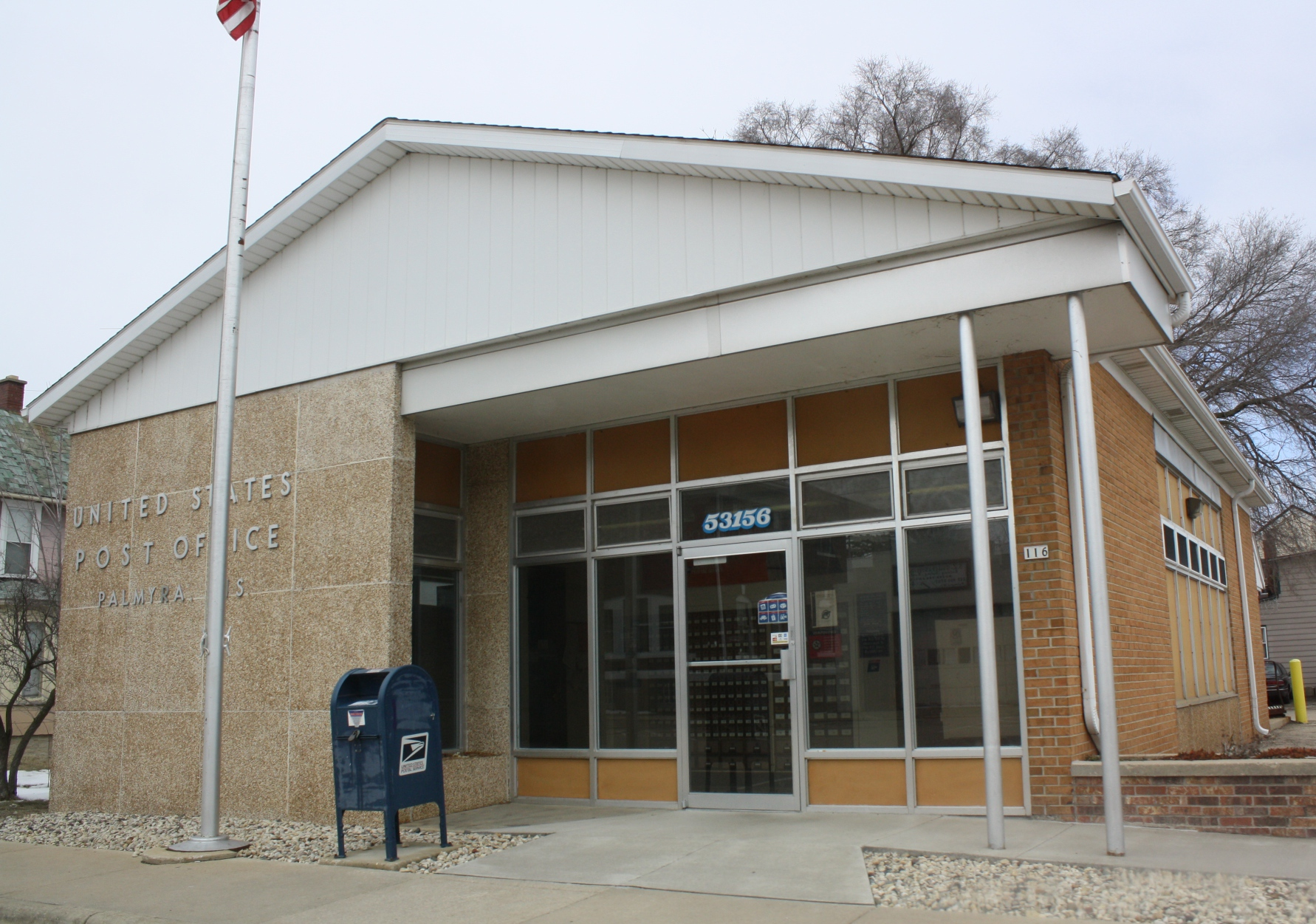
Post office

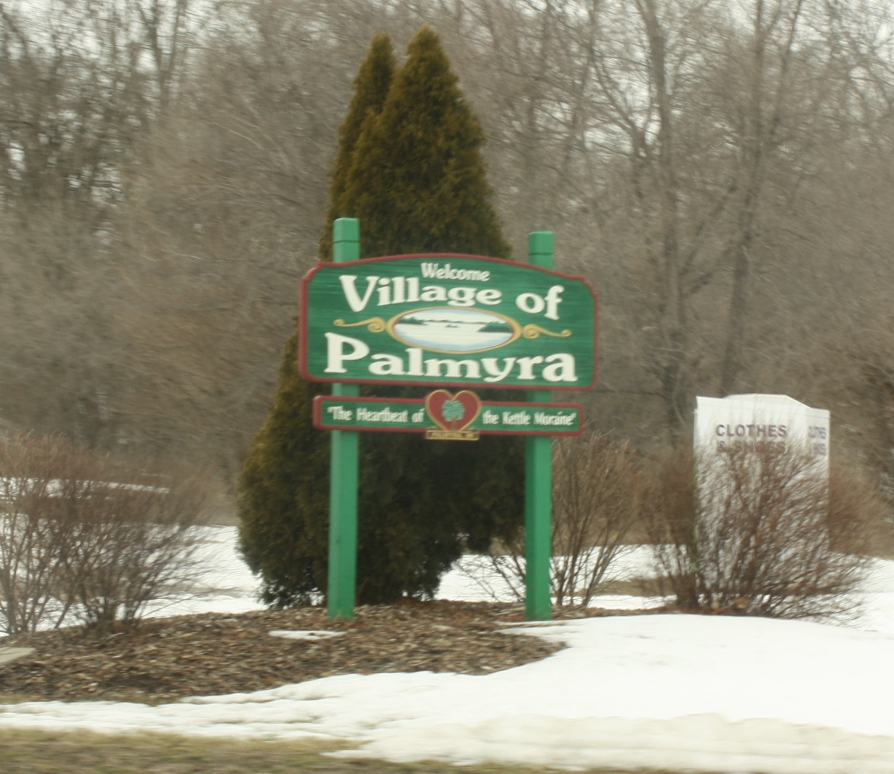
Welcome sign

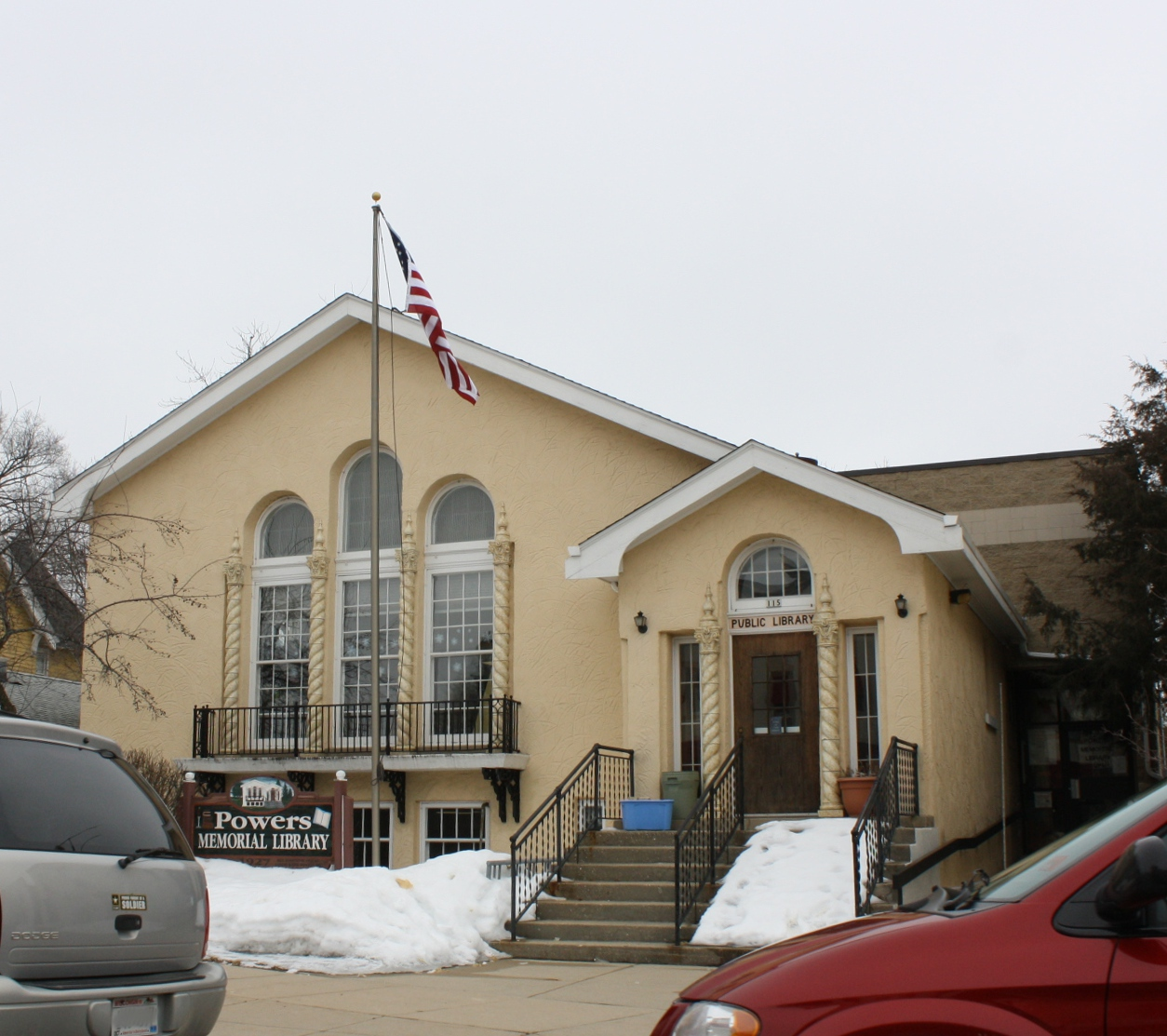
Powers Memorial Library in Palmyra

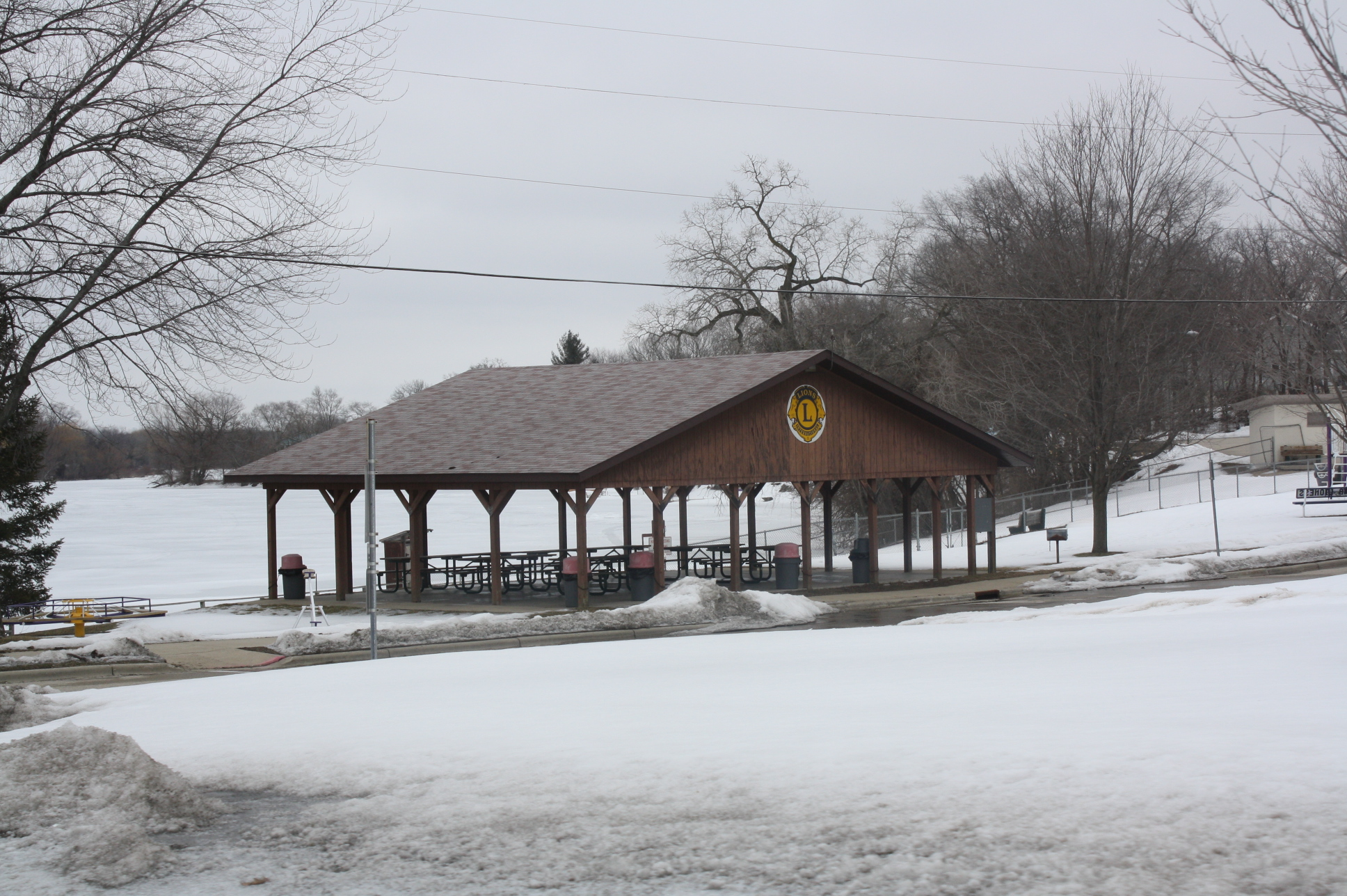
Lions Park

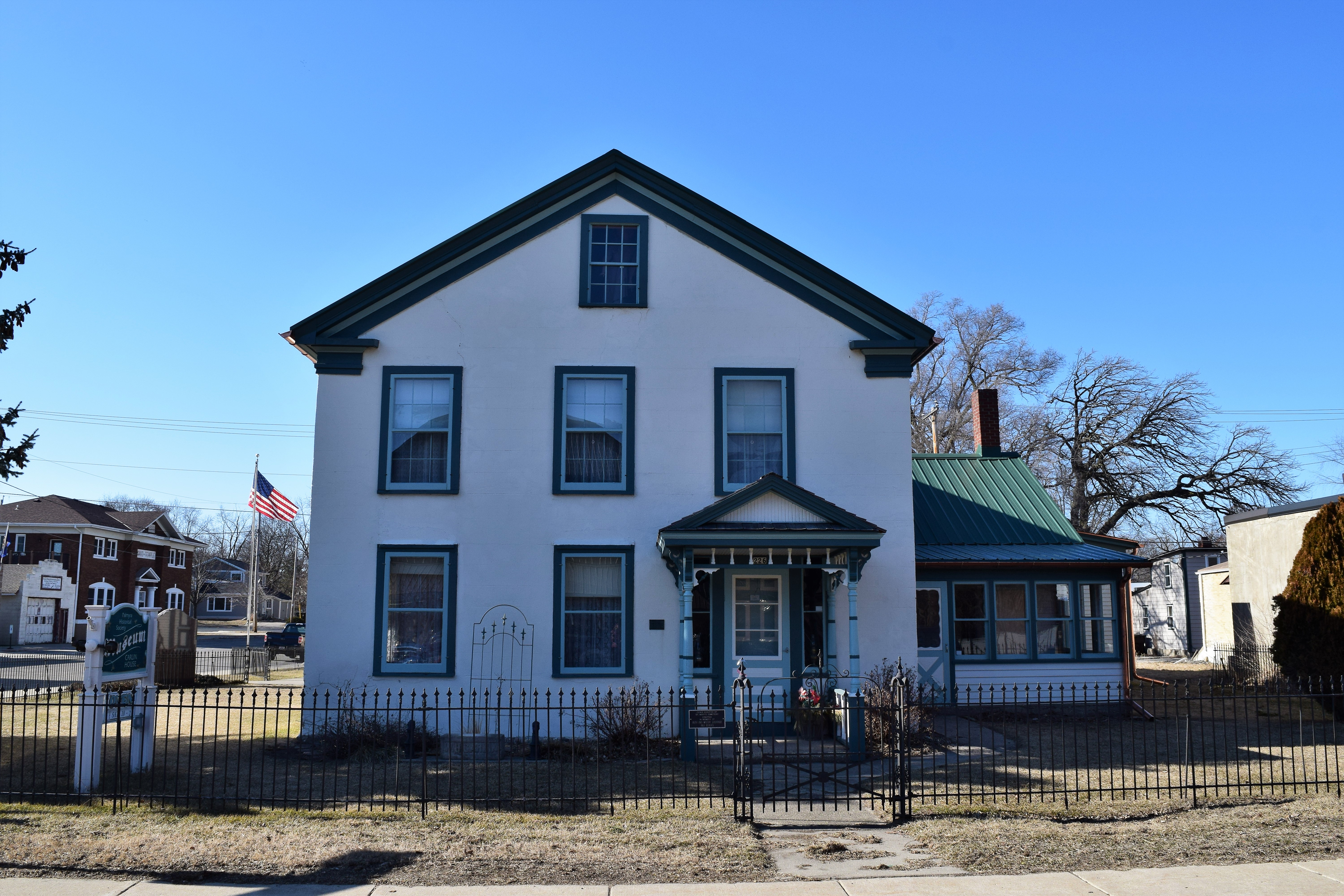
Monroe McKenzie House

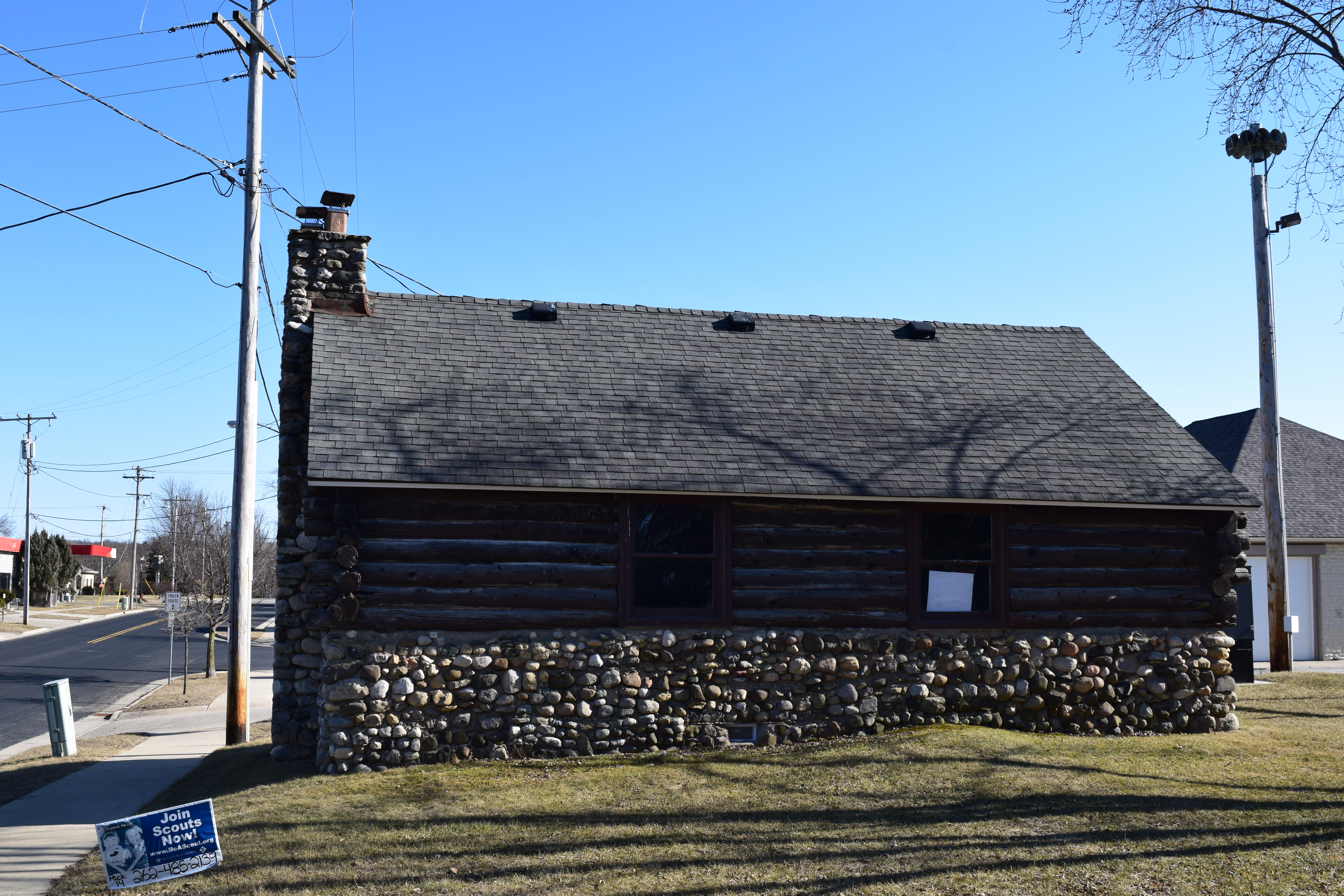
Palmyra Boy Scout Cabin
