= Beck Houses =

Village in Cumbria, England

Coordinates: 54.35°N 02.64°W

- Hamlet
- Location in the former South Lakeland district Location within Cumbria
- OS grid reference: SD5896
- Civil parish: Grayrigg
- Unitary authority: Westmorland and Furness
- Ceremonial county: Cumbria
- Region: North West
- Country: England
- Sovereign state: United Kingdom
- Post town: KENDAL
- Postcode district: LA8
- Dialling code: 01539
- Police: Cumbria
- Fire: Cumbria
- Ambulance: North West
- UK Parliament: Westmorland and Lonsdale

Beck Houses is a hamlet in Cumbria, England. It lies south of Grayrigg in the Westmorland and Furness unitary authority area.

The West Coast Main Line passes close by and provides a popular viewpoint for railway photographers.

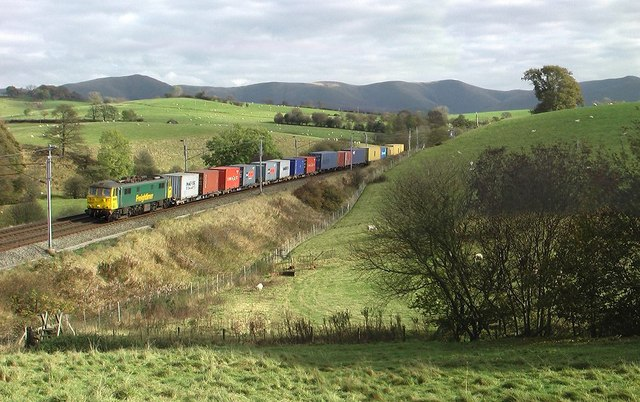
The West Coast Main Line near Beck Houses

The Dales Way long-distance footpath passes just south of Beck Houses, crossing the railway on the minor north-south road through the hamlet.
