= Michael and Margaritha Beck Farmstead =

- U.S. National Register of Historic Places
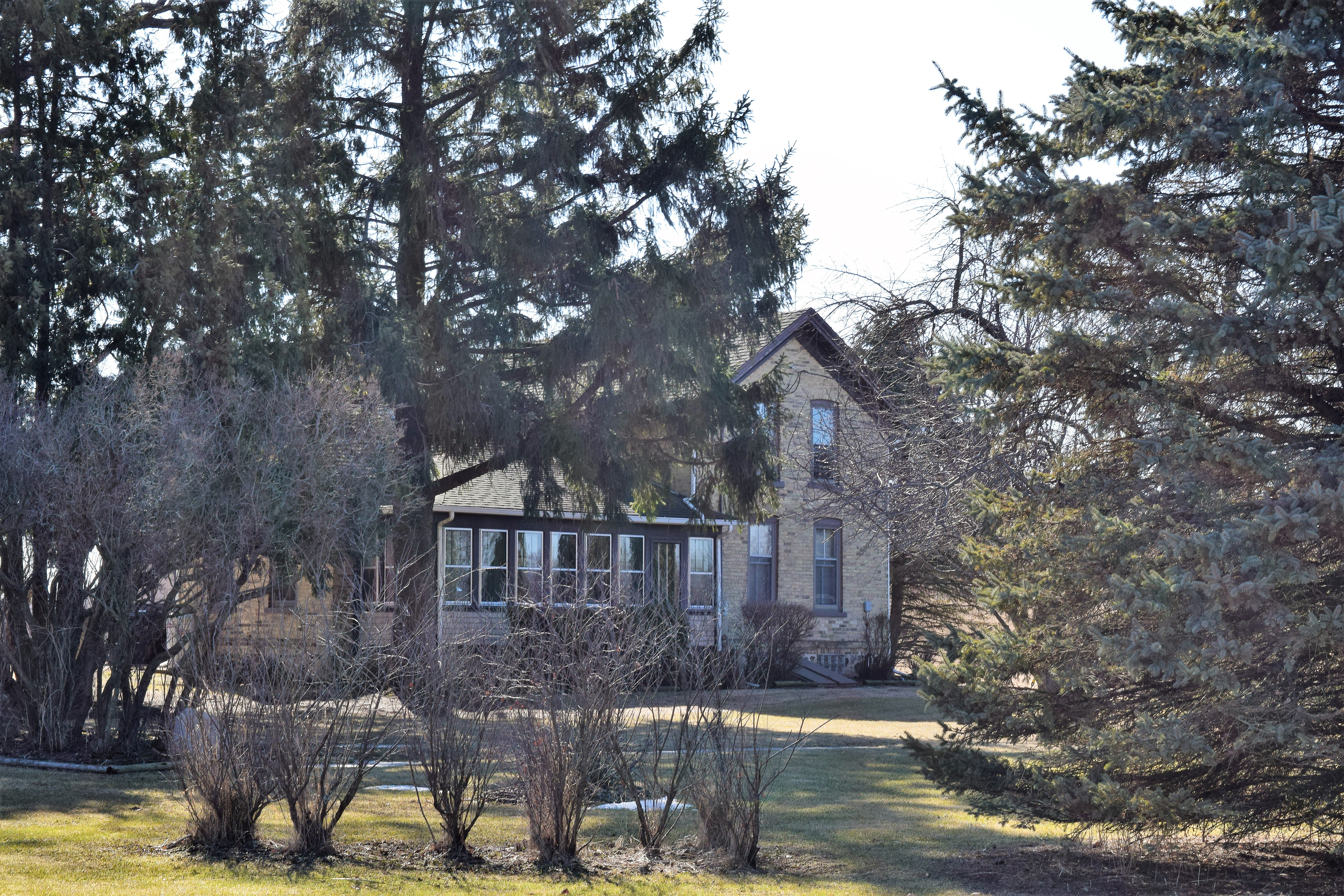
- The farmhouse at the farmstead.
- Location: W2803 US Hwy 18; Jefferson, Wisconsin
- Architectural style: Late 19th and Early 20th Century American Movements
- NRHP reference No.: 100002092
- Added to NRHP: February 5, 2018

The Michael and Margaritha Beck Farmstead is located in Jefferson, Wisconsin.

== History ==
German immigrants Michael and Margaritha Beck (also known as Bieck) established the farm in 1865. It originally specialized in wheat before transitioning to dairy. Structures on the site include a farmhouse, bank barn, milk-house, granary, machine shed and an outhouse. The farmstead was added to the State Register of Historic Places in 2017 and to the National Register of Historic Places in 2018.
