= August and Eliza Fuermann Jr. House =

Historic house in Wisconsin, United States

- U.S. National Register of Historic Places
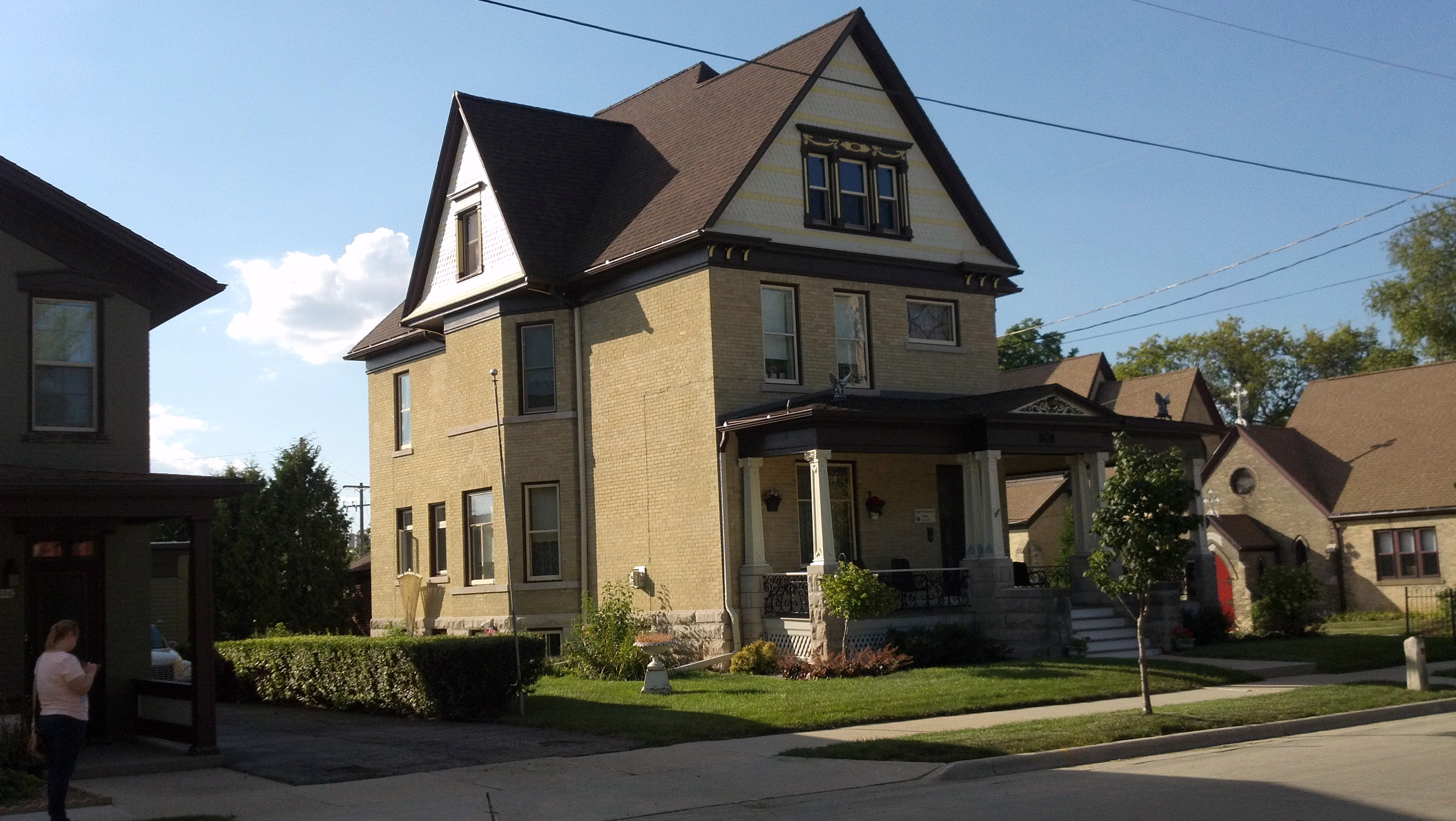
- August and Eliza Fuermann Jr. House
- Location: 500 S. Third St., Watertown, Wisconsin
- Coordinates: 43°11′28″N 88°43′23″W
- Area: less than one acre
- Built: 1893
- Architectural style: Queen Anne
- NRHP reference No.: 89001002
- Added to NRHP: July 27, 1989

The August and Eliza Fuermann Jr. House is a historic house at 500 S. Third Street in Watertown, Wisconsin.

== History ==
The house was built in 1893 for local brewer August Fuermann Jr., his wife Eliza, and their two children. August died unexpectedly later in the same year, and Eliza sold the house to hatmaker Clara Weiss, who lived there for 40 years. The two-and-a-half story brick house has a Queen Anne design with elements of the Neoclassical style; Queen Anne architecture was popular throughout the United States in the late twentieth century. The design features a wraparound front porch with a pavilion at the main entrance, multi-story bay windows on the south and north facades, and a front-facing gable end with decorative shinglework.

The house was added to the National Register of Historic Places on July 27, 1989.
