= Beals and Torrey Shoe Co. Building =

- U.S. National Register of Historic Places
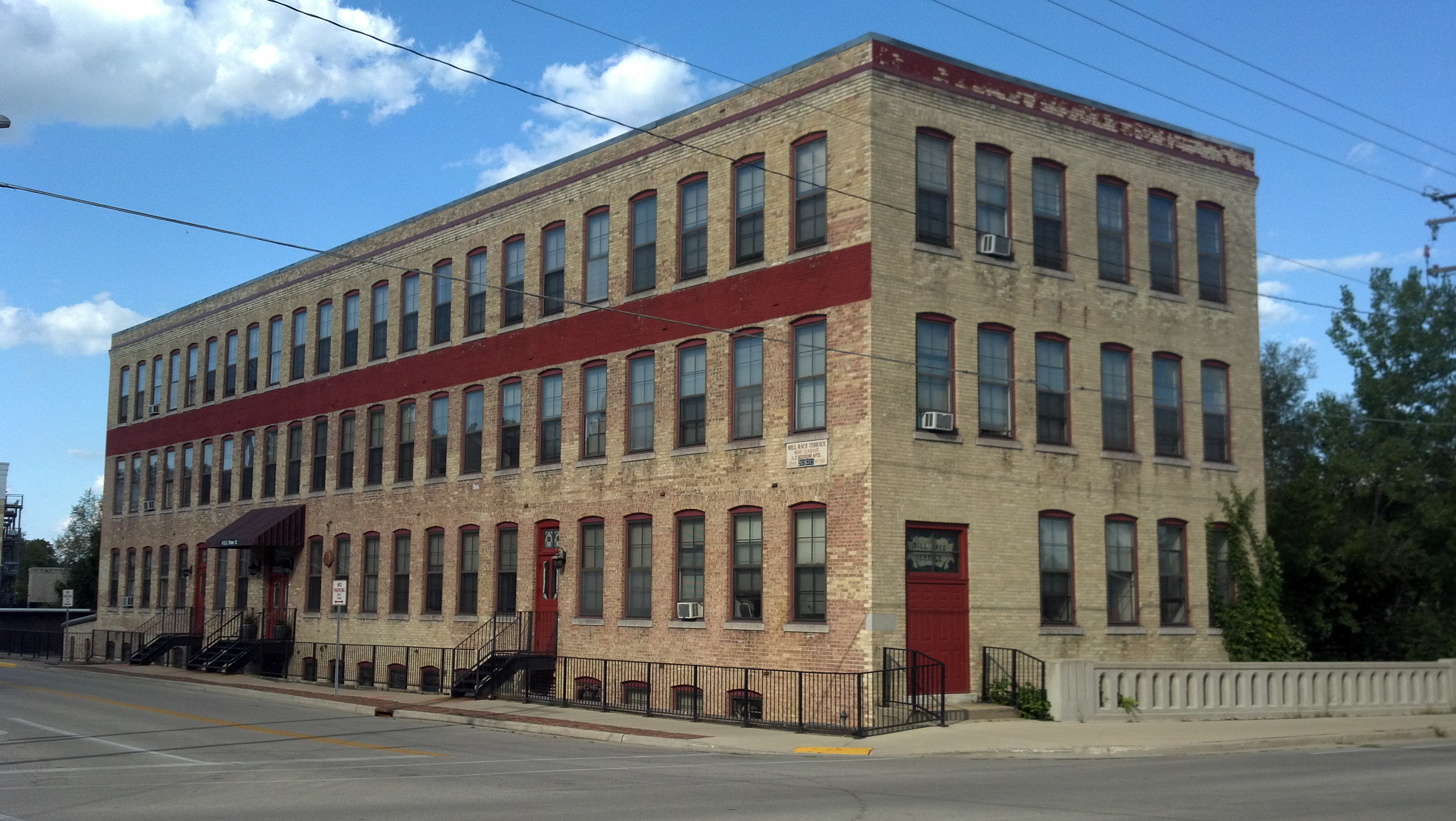
- Beals and Torrey Shoe Co. Building

- Location within Wisconsin Location within the United States
- Location: 100 W. Milwaukee St., Watertown, Wisconsin
- Coordinates: 43°11′24″N 88°43′36″W
- Area: 0.3 acres (0.12 ha)
- Built: 1904
- Architect: Frank L. Lindsay
- NRHP reference No.: 84000699
- Added to NRHP: December 6, 1984

The Beals and Torrey Shoe Co. Building is located in Watertown, Wisconsin.

== History ==
The Beals and Torrey Shoe Co. built the facility and used it as a factory. The company outgrew the building by 1918 and moved to a different site. For several years after, the building was used as a factory for dairy equipment. It has since been converted into apartments.

The building was listed on the National Register of Historic Places in 1984 and on the State Register of Historic Places in 1989.
