= Palmyra Boy Scout Cabin =

- U.S. National Register of Historic Places
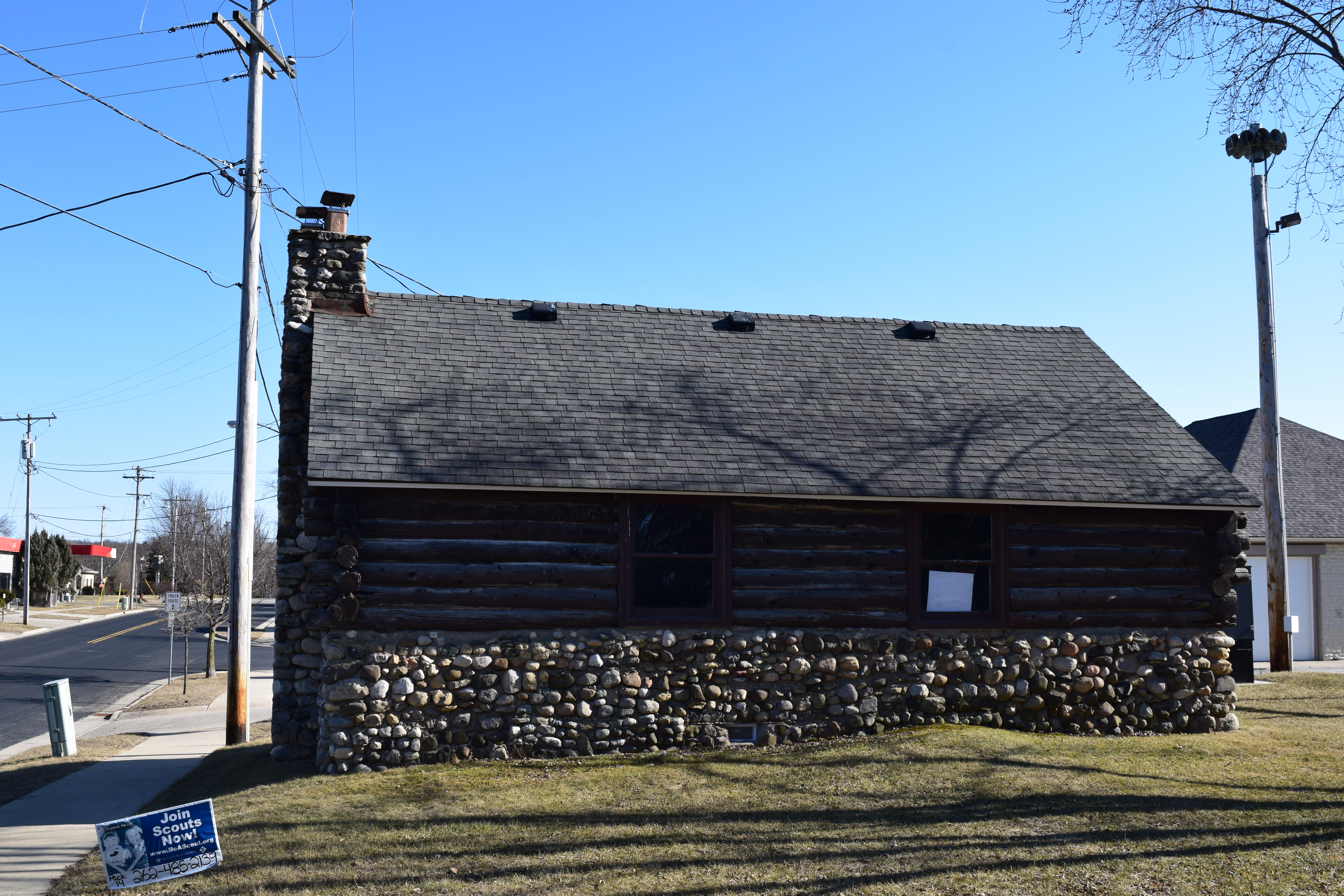
- Palmyra Boy Scout Cabin

- Location within Wisconsin
- Location: 105 N. 1st St. Palmyra, Wisconsin
- Coordinates: 42°52′43″N 88°35′05″W
- Built: 1935-1937
- Architectural style: Rustic/Late 19th and Early 20th Century American Movements
- NRHP reference No.: 100001784
- Added to NRHP: November 6, 2017

The Palmyra Boy Scout Cabin is a log cabin at 105 N. 1st Street in Palmyra, Wisconsin. Palmyra's Boy Scout Troop 14 built the cabin from 1935 to 1937. At the time, building a troop cabin was a popular activity for Boy Scouts and encouraged by the national organization; the Boy Scout Handbook included instructions on how to build a cabin, and Boys Life magazine featured completed cabins. Scouts and their fathers built the cabin; the Palmyra cabin took two years to complete on account of the Great Depression, which limited the troop's funds for building supplies, and many of the cabin's materials were donated. The one-room cabin measures 22 by 32 feet (6.7 by 9.8 m) and uses saddle notch corners, which are designed to tighten over time as the building settles. The Boy Scouts have used the cabin continuously since it was built, and the cabin was renovated in the 2000s.

The cabin was added to the State and the National Register of Historic Places in 2017.
