= Klir Beck House =

Historic house in Maine, United States

- Formerly listed on the U.S. National Register of Historic Places
- Location within Maine Location within the United States
- Location: Vienna, Maine
- Coordinates: 44°30′26″N 70°0′5″W
- Area: 1 acre (0.40 ha)
- Built: 1927
- Built by: Beck, Klir A.
- NRHP reference No.: 77000067, updated to 100001239

Significant dates
- Added to NRHP: November 23, 1977
- Removed from NRHP: June 30, 2017

The Klir Beck House, also known as The Gnomes, was a historic house in Vienna, Maine. It was an architecturally idiosyncratic house, built by the artist Klir Beck as a summer residence. It was listed on the National Register of Historic Places in 1977, and was destroyed by fire in 2000. It was delisted in 2017.

== Description and history ==
The Klir Beck House stood in a rural area of Vienna, west of the village center of adjacent Mount Vernon, in a setting of woods, fields, and lakes. It was a 1 1/2-story structure, built out of a combination of materials. It had an irregularly coursed stone foundation, a ground floor finished in half-timbered brick, and the half story was finished in half-timbered stucco. The roof was gabled, with a cross gable section and main gable end that each feature a projecting hipped overhang, with a carved wooden balcony in the style of a Swiss chateau. Some of the wall sections created by the half-timbering were further decorated, several exhibiting a lotus pattern on a brick background. The interior was equally rich and fanciful, including a compass set in stone on the living room floor.

The house was built in 1927 by Klir Beck, in part by adapting and altering an existing 19th-century farmhouse. Beck was well known in artistic circles, and is credited with creating dioramas that are displayed in the Maine State Museum. In January 2000, a fire broke out in the basement, resulting in the destruction of the house.

== See also ==
- National Register of Historic Places listings in Kennebec County, Maine
