= Waldron–Beck House and Carriage House =

Historic house in Indiana, United States

- U.S. National Register of Historic Places
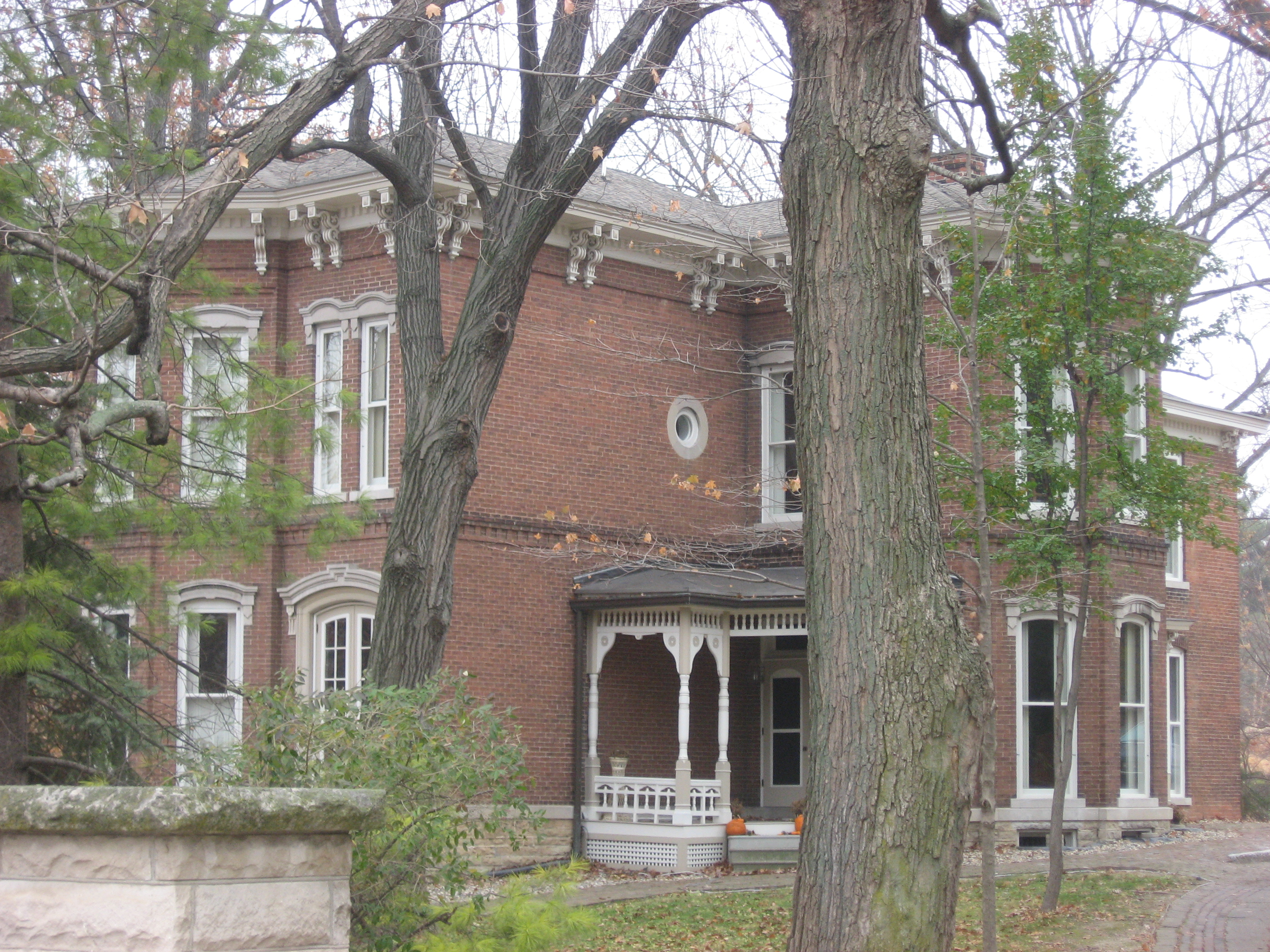
- Waldron–Beck House, November 2010

- Location within Tippecanoe County, Indiana Location within Indiana Location within the United States
- Location: 829 N. 21st St., Lafayette, Indiana
- Coordinates: 40°25′33″N 86°52′21″W
- Area: 1.1 acres (0.45 ha)
- Built: 1877
- Architectural style: Italianate
- NRHP reference No.: 84001661
- Added to NRHP: February 9, 1984

Waldron–Beck House and Carriage House is a historic home and carriage house located at Lafayette, Indiana. The house was built in 1877, and is a two-story, irregularly shaped Italianate style brick dwelling, with a rear service wing. It sits on a stone foundation and has a multi-hipped roof with bracketed cornice. It features a three-sided, two-story projecting bay. The carriage house is a two-story, three bay brick building. It has a hipped roof with cupola and a bracketed cornice.

It was listed on the National Register of Historic Places in 1984.
