= Main Street Commercial Historic District (Watertown, Wisconsin) =

Historic district in Wisconsin, United States

- U.S. National Register of Historic Places
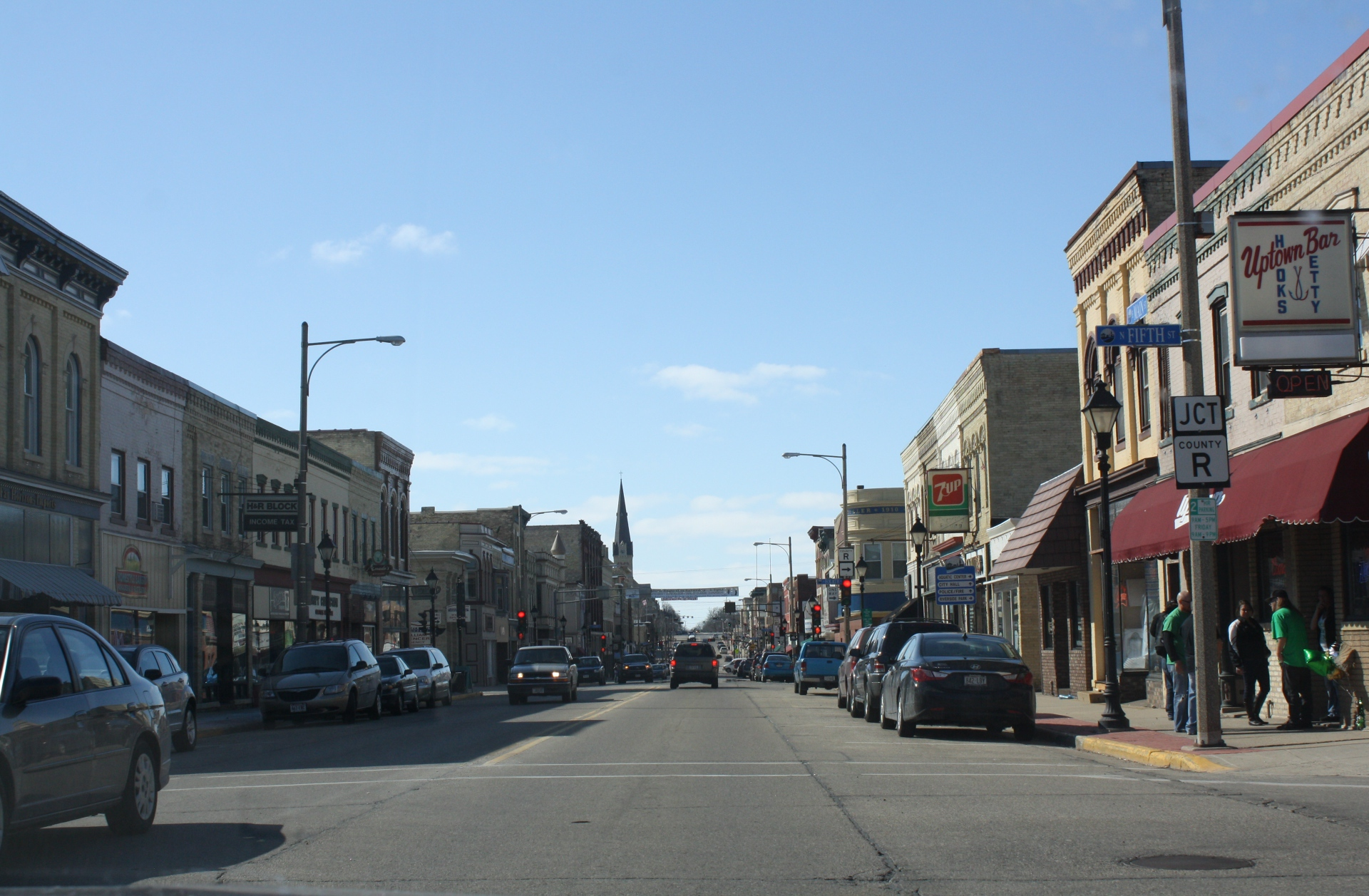
- A portion of the district.
- Location: Roughly Main St. from N. Washington St. to S. Seventh St., Watertown, Wisconsin
- Area: 29 acres (12 ha)
- NRHP reference No.: 89000483
- Added to NRHP: June 2, 1989

The Main Street Commercial Historic District is located in Watertown, Wisconsin.

The district is made up of Watertown's old downtown with 127 contributing buildings, including the 1855 Commercial Vernacular Johnson Drug Store, the 1855 Italianate Dennis Block, the 1858 Italianate Misegades Wagon Works, the 1876 Queen Anne/Romanesque Platz and Brandt dry goods Store, and the 1907 Neoclassical Public Library.

It includes the Masonic Temple (1906), also known as Fischer Department Store.
