= Main Street Commercial Historic District (Jefferson, Wisconsin) =

Historic district in Wisconsin, United States

- U.S. National Register of Historic Places
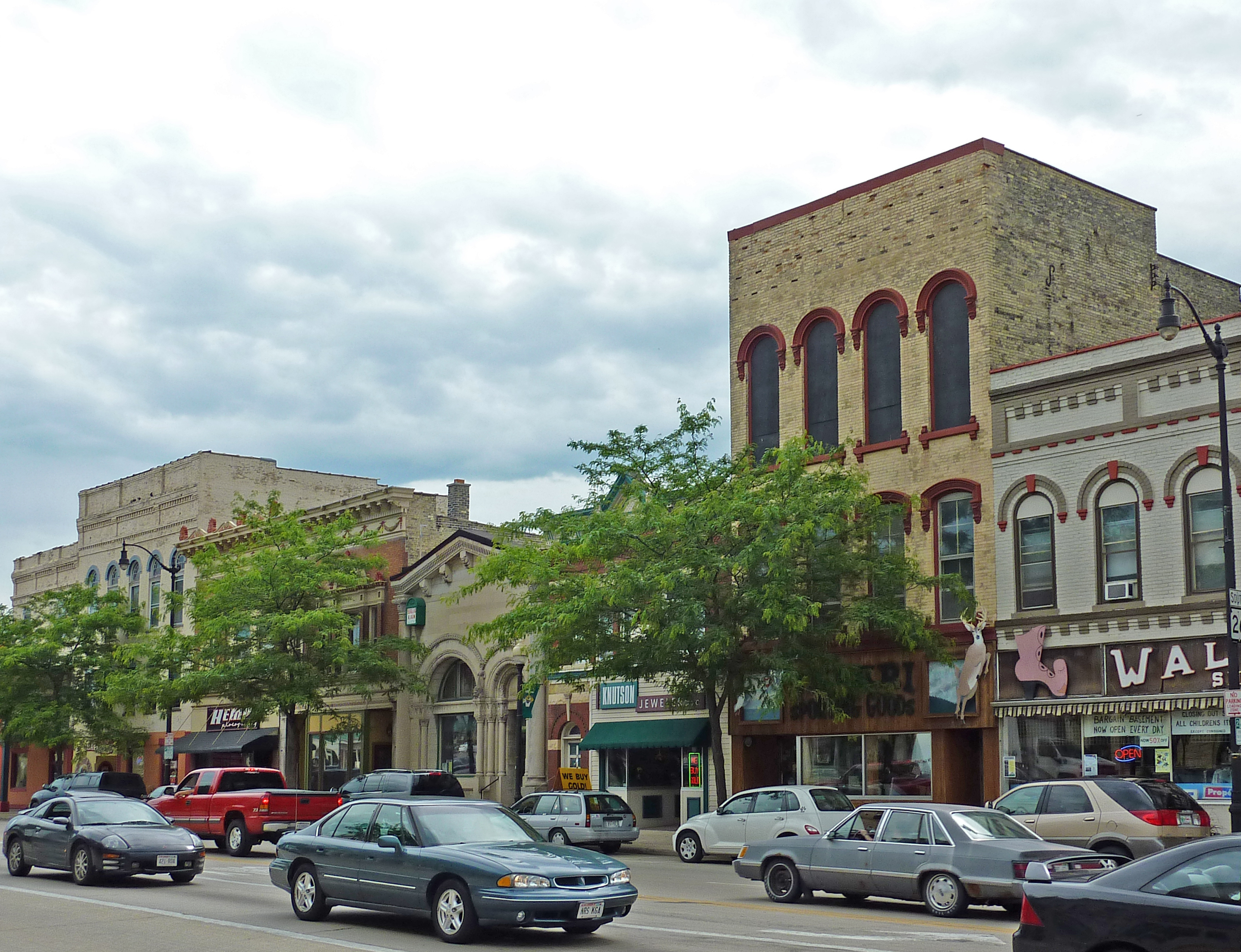
- A portion of the district.
- Location: Roughly bounded by Dodge St., Center Ave., Mechanic St., and Rock R., Jefferson, Wisconsin
- Area: 12 acres (4.9 ha)
- NRHP reference No.: 97001627
- Added to NRHP: January 7, 1998

The Main Street Commercial Historic District is located in Jefferson, Wisconsin.

== Description ==
The district is made up of Jefferson's old downtown, including the 1860 Jefferson House hotel, the 1869/1907 Neuer Saloon/Sample room, the 1884 Italianate Beinfang Block, the 1892 Queen Anne Fisher Building, the 1896 Gothic Revival Stoppenbach Meat Market, the eclectic 1902 Jefferson County Bank, the 1911-12 Neoclassical Farmers & Merchants Bank, the 1914 Craftsman-style C&NW Depot, and the 1930 Art Deco Ziegler Garage.
