= St. Wenceslaus Church, Wisconsin =

Historic church in Wisconsin, United States

- St. Wenceslaus Roman Catholic Church
- U.S. National Register of Historic Places
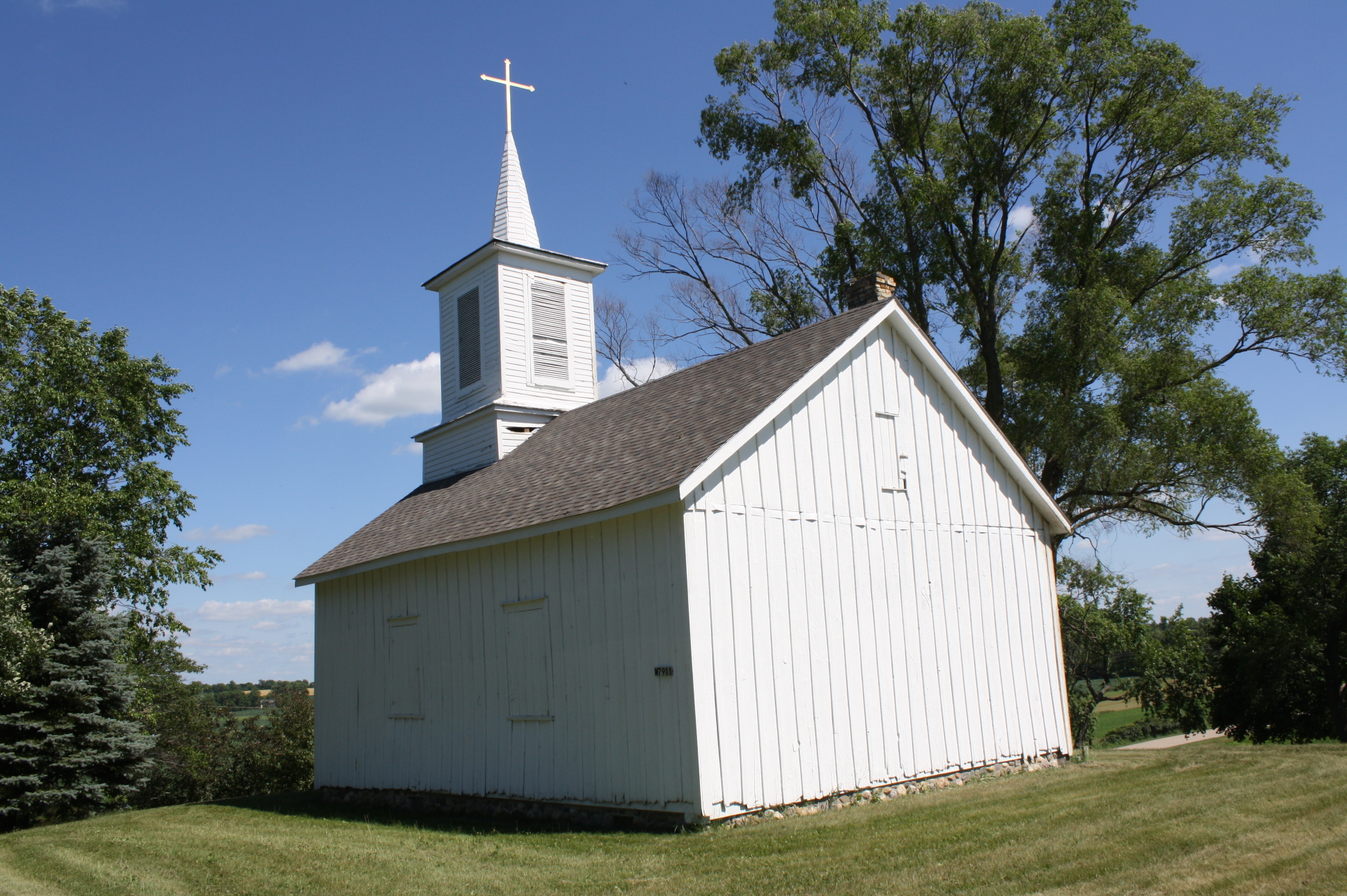
- St. Wenceslaus Roman Catholic Church
- Location: Waterloo, Wisconsin
- Coordinates: 43.16114°N 88.92125°W
- NRHP reference No.: 75000070
- Added to NRHP: May 12, 1975

St. Wenceslaus Roman Catholic Church, also known as the Island Church, was built around 1863 by settlers on an island of high ground in the Blue Joint Marsh a couple miles southeast of Waterloo, Wisconsin. It was added to the National Register of Historic Places in 1975.

In the mid-1840s and 50s, immigrants from Germany and Bohemia (now western Czech Republic) settled on the high ground in the Blue Joint Marsh to farm. Most of the immigrants from Bohemia came from four villages within walking distance of each other. Many were Catholic, and in their new land they wanted a place to worship.

About 1863 they built their small church, with walls of tamarack logs. Richard Perrin considered this rare surviving log church important enough to include in his book The Architecture of Wisconsin. He guessed that the logs were exposed on the outside for the first few years, then covered with the vertical board and batten pictured. Two windows on each side are protected with wooden shutters. Entry is through a small vestibule centered at the front of the building. Above that entry rises a two-stage louvered belfry which holds the church's original bell. Above that a narrow spire rises to a metal cross.

Inside, the log walls are coated with lime plaster. The altar is white, with a picture of St. Wenceslaus, patron of Bohemia, flanked by Mary and Joseph. Framed pictures of the Stations of the Cross hang high on the walls, with a wrought-iron candle-holder beneath each. (Perrin suggested that this was a rather Slavic arrangement, and the church as a whole reminded him of simple Slavic churches from Europe.) The pews are original, made from pine long ago by local carpenter John Fiedler. In the aisle stands an iron stove to warm the congregation in winter.

St. Wenceslaus never had its own resident pastor. Instead it was visited by priests and missionaries from Milwaukee and Jefferson, and the pastor from St. Joseph's in Waterloo. Regular use of the building ended in 1891, but locals (in particular Henry Bartosch) took care of their church.

In years since, the Blue Joint Marsh has largely dried up, but St. Wenceslaus still sits on the high ground, with some of its founders buried in the cemetery nearby. It survives very much as in the 1800s, thanks to its small congregation, its proximity to St. Joseph's in Waterloo, its closing over a hundred years ago, and the faithful work of volunteers. The church is now cared for by the Island Church Foundation, which hosts a family picnic each July and a St Wenceslaus Day celebration each September.
