= Jefferson, Wisconsin =

- City
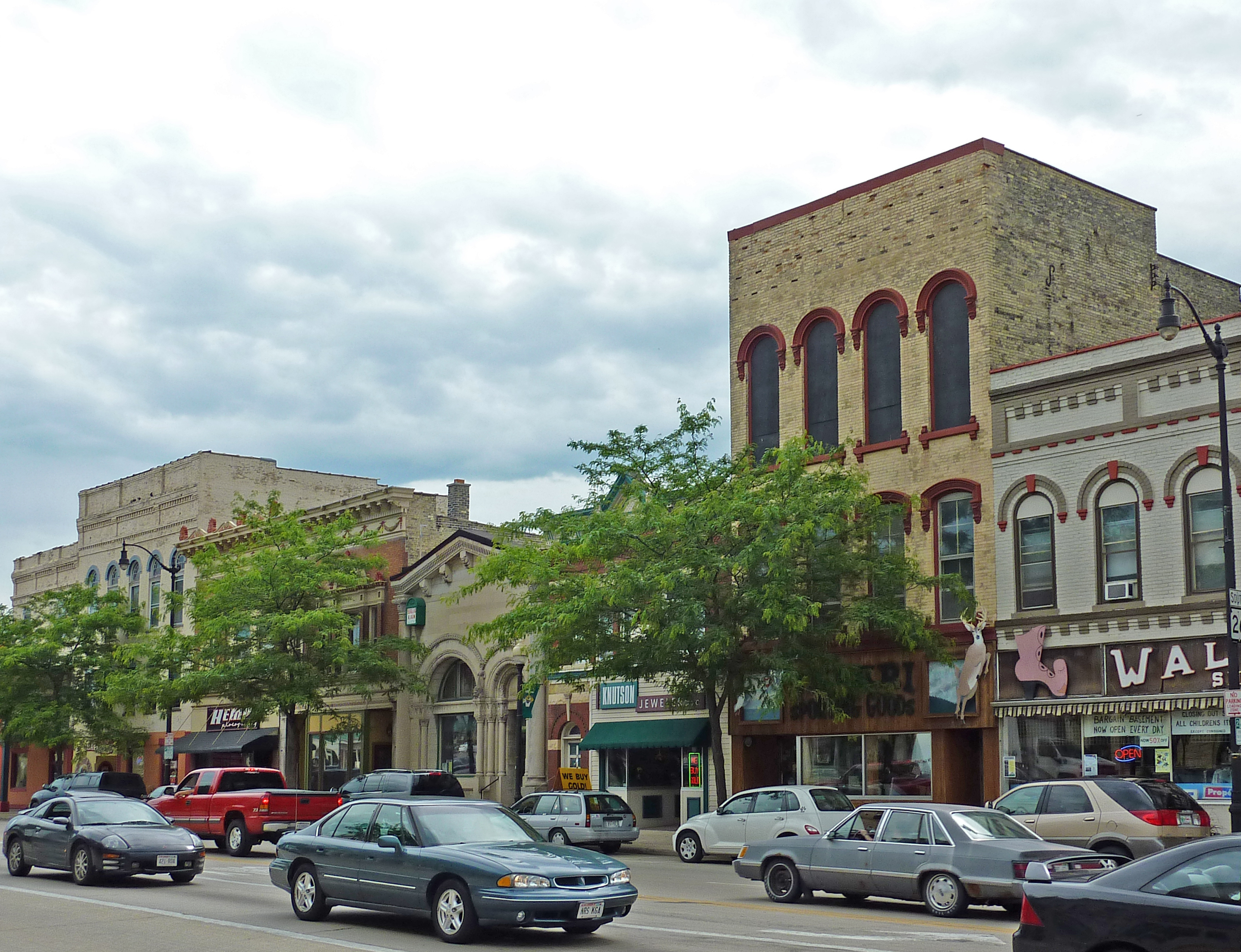
- Main Street Commercial Historic District
- Nickname: The Gemütlichkeit City
- Location of Jefferson in Jefferson County, Wisconsin.

- Location within Wisconsin Location within the United States
- Coordinates: 43°0′11″N 88°48′28″W
- Country: United States
- State: Wisconsin
- County: Jefferson
- City: March 19, 1878
- Village: March 9, 1857

Government
  - Type: Mayor–council
  - Mayor: Dale Oppermann

Area
  - Total: 6.03 sq mi (15.61 km^{2})
  - Land: 5.82 sq mi (15.08 km^{2})
  - Water: 0.21 sq mi (0.54 km^{2})
- Elevation: 801 ft (244 m)

Population (2020)
  - Total: 7,793
  - Density: 1,338.5/sq mi (516.8/km^{2})
- Time zone: UTC-6 (Central (CST))
  - Summer (DST): UTC-5 (CDT)
- Zip Code: 53549
- Area code: 920
- FIPS code: 55-37900
- GNIS feature ID: 1567111
- Website: www.jeffersonwis.com

Jefferson is a city in Jefferson County, Wisconsin, United States, and its county seat. It lies at the confluence of the Rock and Crawfish rivers. The population was 7,793 at the 2020 census. The city is partially bordered by the Town of Jefferson.

== History ==
Jefferson's founders were settlers from New England, part of a wave of New England farmers who headed west into what was then the wilds of the Northwest Territory during the early 1800s. Specifically, on December 18, 1836, three settlers, all of them from Milwaukee, Rodney J. Currier, Andrew Lansing and Capt. Robert Masters, came from Bark Mills (Hebron) and "distributed" themselves about the Jefferson area. Currier and Lansing were the first known settlers in the area as they later erected a log cabin on a claim previously made. Most arrived as a result of the completion of the Erie Canal as well as the end of the Black Hawk War. Jefferson's location was selected to make use of the water power and transportation opportunities offered by the Rock River. It was the furthest point a steamboat could navigate the Rock in 1839. Later bridges built downstream prevented such navigation.

When settlers arrived in what is now Jefferson, they entered a landscape of dense forest and prairie that lay within ancestral Ho-Chunk and Potawatomi territory and near Aztalan, a significant Mississippian-period site attesting to the region’s long Indigenous presence. They built farms, roads, and government buildings and established post routes. They brought many of their Yankee values, such as a passion for education, establishing many schools as well as staunch support for abolitionism. They were mostly members of the Congregationalist Church though some were Episcopalian. Due to the second Great Awakening some had converted to Methodism and others had become Baptists before moving to Jefferson. Like much of Wisconsin, Jefferson would be culturally very continuous with New England culture for most of its early history.

Jefferson was incorporated as a village by an 1857 act of the Wisconsin Legislature and was then incorporated as a city in March 1878.

The Jefferson County Fairgrounds hosted horse buggy racing prior to the renovations to the new fairgrounds.

Gemütlichkeit Days was started in 1971 to celebrate the German heritage of many of the residents of the Jefferson area. The festival was first held under tents in the downtown area. The festival quickly grew and in 1975 the festival was moved to the Jefferson County Fair grounds and has been held there every year since then.

== Geography ==
Jefferson is located at 43°0′11″N 88°48′28″W (43.003091, -88.807855).

According to the United States Census Bureau, the city has a total area of 5.93 sq mi (15.36 km^{2}), of which 5.72 sq mi (14.81 km^{2}) is land and 0.21 sq mi (0.54 km^{2}) is water.

Jefferson's elevation is 797 ft (243 m) at the center of downtown.

== Demographics ==
Historical population
Census	Pop.	Note	%±
1850	550		—
1860	1,369		148.9%
1870	2,176		58.9%
1880	2,115		−2.8%
1890	2,287		8.1%
1900	2,584		13.0%
1910	2,582		−0.1%
1920	2,572		−0.4%
1930	2,639		2.6%
1940	3,059		15.9%
1950	3,625		18.5%
1960	4,548		25.5%
1970	5,429		19.4%
1980	5,647		4.0%
1990	6,078		7.6%
2000	7,338		20.7%
2010	7,973		8.7%
2020	7,793		−2.3%
U.S. Decennial Census; 2010–2020

=== 2010 census ===
As of the census of 2010, there were 7,973 people, 3,132 households, and 1,989 families living in the city. The population density was 1,393.9 inhabitants per square mile (538.2/km^{2}). There were 3,378 housing units at an average density of 590.6 per square mile (228.0/km^{2}). The racial makeup of the city was 91.2% White, 0.7% African American, 0.4% Native American, 0.7% Asian, 0.1% Pacific Islander, 5.4% from other races, and 1.5% from two or more races. Hispanic or Latino of any race were 11.8% of the population.

There were 3,132 households, of which 32.5% had children under the age of 18 living with them, 47.8% were married couples living together, 10.4% had a female householder with no husband present, 5.3% had a male householder with no wife present, and 36.5% were non-families. 29.8% of all households were made up of individuals, and 13.2% had someone living alone who was 65 years of age or older. The average household size was 2.42 and the average family size was 3.00.

The median age in the city was 37.5 years. 24.4% of residents were under the age of 18; 7.8% were between the ages of 18 and 24; 27.8% were from 25 to 44; 24.4% were from 45 to 64; and 15.7% were 65 years of age or older. The gender makeup of the city was 49.8% male and 50.2% female.

=== 2000 census ===
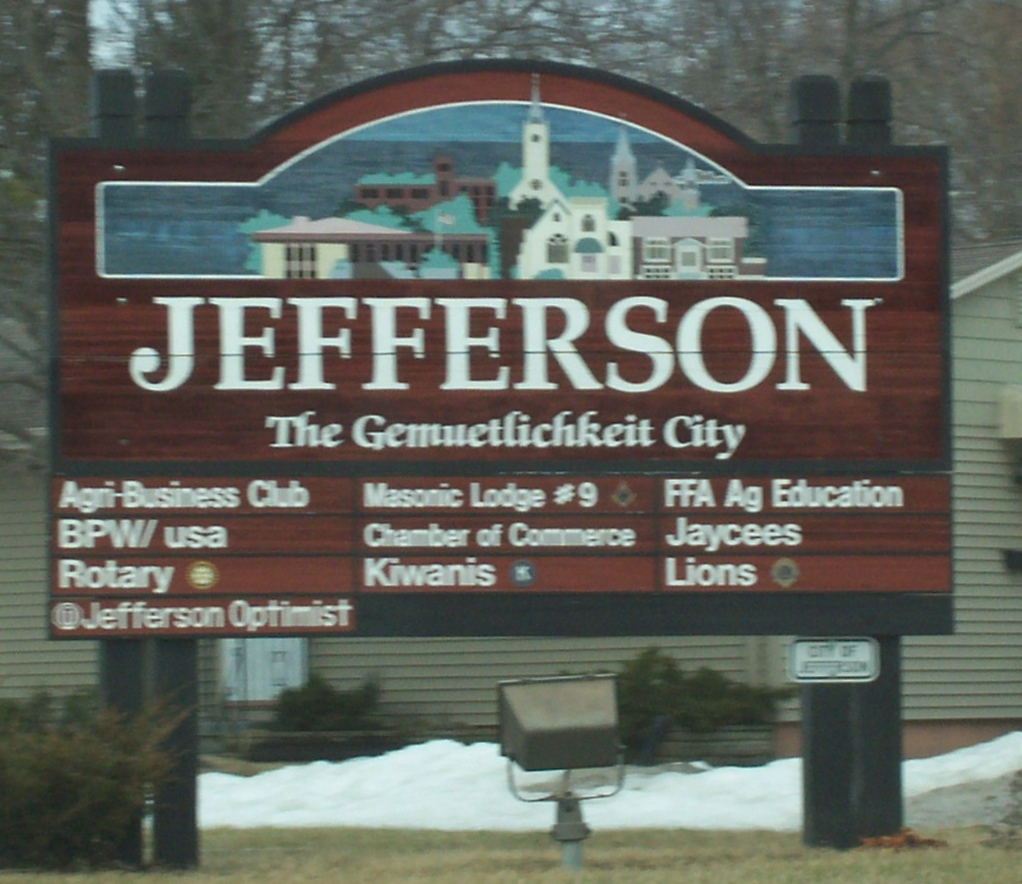
Welcome sign

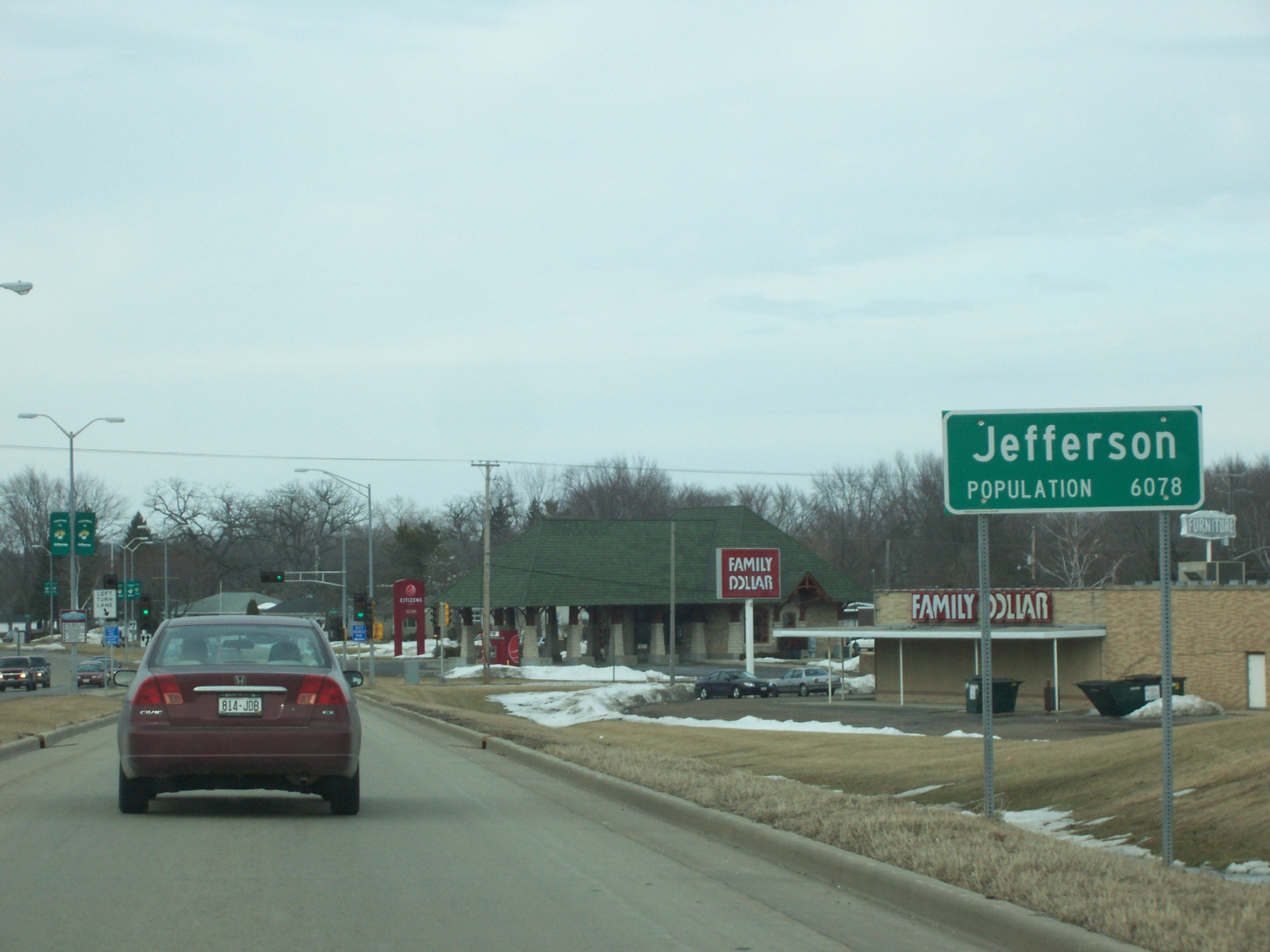
Population sign

As of the census of 2000, there were 7,338 people, 2,816 households, and 1,819 families living in the city. The population density was 1,645.9 people per square mile (635.3/km^{2}). There were 2,934 housing units at an average density of 658.1 per square mile (254.0/km^{2}). The racial makeup of the city was 94.28% White, 0.53% Black or African American, 0.55% Native American, 0.46% Asian, 0.03% Pacific Islander, 3.04% from other races, and 1.12% from two or more races. 6.79% of the population were Hispanic or Latino of any race.

There were 2,816 households, out of which 30.9% had children under the age of 18 living with them, 50.8% were married couples living together, 10.2% had a female householder with no husband present, and 35.4% were non-families. 28.3% of all households were made up of individuals, and 12.0% had someone living alone who was 65 years of age or older. The average household size was 2.41 and the average family size was 2.96.

In the city, the population was spread out, with 22.8% under the age of 18, 9.8% from 18 to 24, 31.4% from 25 to 44, 20.1% from 45 to 64, and 16.1% who were 65 years of age or older. The median age was 36 years. For every 100 females, there were 98.4 males. For every 100 females age 18 and over, there were 94.7 males.

The median income for a household in the city was $40,962, and the median income for a family was $47,737. Males had a median income of $32,500 versus $25,142 for females. The per capita income for the city was $19,124. About 5.4% of families and 8.3% of the population were below the poverty line, including 11.2% of those under age 18 and 7.0% of those age 65 or over

== Education ==
In Jefferson there are six schools: two elementary schools, one middle school, one high school, and two private schools. The names of the schools are East Elementary, West Elementary, Jefferson Middle School, Jefferson High School, St. John's Catholic, and St. John's Lutheran. East Elementary School was built as a public works project in 1939 during the Great Depression. The fight song for Jefferson High School is a version of 'On Wisconsin' music with words dedicated to the students of JHS.

== Economy ==
Valero Renewables is an ethanol plant located in Jefferson. There is also a Purina cat food manufacturing plant and a Generac Power Systems plant.

== Notable people ==
- Claire B. Bird, Wisconsin state senator, born in Jefferson
- Ira W. Bird, Wisconsin State Representative and mayor of Jefferson
- Paul M. Blayney, U.S. Coast Guard admiral
- Christopher Grimm, Wisconsin State Representative, lived in Jefferson
- George Grimm, Wisconsin State Representative and judge, born in Jefferson
- Kenneth E. Gruennert, Medal of Honor recipient, attended school in Jefferson
- Robert Kirkland Henry, congressman, born in Jefferson
- Rosemary Kennedy, sister of President John F. Kennedy, lived in Jefferson
- Lance Leipold, head football coach at the University of Kansas
- William W. Reed, Wisconsin state senator and representative, lived in Jefferson
- Oscar F. Roessler, Wisconsin State Representative and newspaper editor, was born in Jefferson
- Zeke Sanborn, Olympic gold medalist in rowing, born in Jefferson
- Joseph Stoppenbach, Wisconsin State Representative, born in Jefferson
- Wilbur H. Tousley, Wisconsin State Representative, lived in Jefferson
