= Wisconsin's Jefferson County 2nd Assembly district =

Former American legislative district

Wisconsin's Jefferson County 2nd State Assembly district
- Obsolete
- Notes: 1848–1922

Wisconsin's Jefferson County 2nd Assembly district was a district in the Wisconsin State Assembly for much of the history of the state of Wisconsin, prior to the legislative redistricting reforms of 1972 which created the current numbered districts. Located in southeast Wisconsin, the district was one of the 66 original Assembly districts defined in Article XIV of the Constitution of Wisconsin. The Constitution originally allocated three districts for Jefferson County, Wisconsin; this district originally comprised roughly the eastern quarter of Jefferson County.

The district was in use for the first 74 years of Wisconsin's history, from 1848 to 1922.

== List of representatives ==
List of representatives from the Jefferson County 2nd district
Member	Party	Residence	Term start	Term end	Leg.
District created
Peter H. Turner	Dem.	Palmyra	June 5, 1848	January 1, 1849	1st
Jarvis K. Pike	Whig	Cold Spring	January 1, 1849	January 7, 1850	2nd
Austin Kellogg	Dem.	Concord	January 7, 1850	January 6, 1851	3rd
Samuel T. Clothier	Dem.	Cold Spring	January 6, 1851	January 5, 1852	4th
Jacob Skinner	Whig	Palmyra	January 5, 1852	January 3, 1853	5th
James H. Ostrander	Whig	Aztalan	January 3, 1853	January 2, 1854	6th
William Eustis	Whig	Oakland	January 2, 1854	January 1, 1855	7th
John G. Merriam	Rep.	Lake Mills	January 1, 1855	January 7, 1856	8th
Henry C. Drake	Rep.	Milford	January 7, 1856	January 5, 1857	9th
Jared F. Ostrander	Rep.	Aztalan	January 5, 1857	January 4, 1858	10th
George C. Smith	Rep.	Oakland	January 4, 1858	January 2, 1860	11th 12th
Charles Hammarquist	Rep.	Fort Atkinson	January 2, 1860	January 7, 1861	13th
Horace B. Willard	Rep.	Lake Mills	January 7, 1861	January 6, 1862	14th
Walter S. Greene	Union	Milford	January 6, 1862	January 4, 1864	15th 16th
Aaron Smith	Union	Lake Mills	January 4, 1864	January 2, 1865	17th
Gardner Spoor	Union	Aztalan	January 2, 1865	January 1, 1866	18th
John Mosher	Union	Waterloo	January 1, 1866	January 7, 1867	19th
Gustavus Bryant	Union	Lake Mills	January 7, 1867	January 6, 1868	20th
Charles P. Goodrich	Rep.	Oakland	January 6, 1868	January 4, 1869	21st
Sylvester J. Conklin	Rep.	Waterloo	January 4, 1869	January 3, 1870	22nd
Charles H. Phillips	Rep.	Lake Mills	January 3, 1870	January 2, 1871	23rd
William Lawrence Hoskins	Dem.	Lake Mills	January 2, 1871	January 6, 1873	24th 25th
Casper Steinfort	Lib.R.	Lake Mills	January 6, 1873	January 5, 1874	26th
Austin Kellogg	Dem.	Concord	January 5, 1874	January 3, 1876	27th 28th
Charles H. Phillips	Rep.	Lake Mills	January 3, 1876	January 7, 1878	29th 30th
John Dwight Bullock	Rep.	Johnson Creek	January 7, 1878	January 2, 1882	31st 32nd 33rd 34th
Jacob Leonardson	Rep.	Waterloo	January 2, 1882	January 1, 1883	35th
Samuel A. Craig	Dem.	Fort Atkinson	January 1, 1883	January 3, 1887	36th 37th
George Grimm	Rep.	Jefferson	January 3, 1887	January 7, 1889	38th
Mark Curtis	Rep.	Hebron	January 7, 1889	January 5, 1891	39th
Joseph Stoppenbach	Dem.	Jefferson	January 5, 1891	January 2, 1893	40th
Christopher Grimm	Dem.	Jefferson	January 2, 1893	January 7, 1895	41st
Henry C. Christians	Dem.	Johnson Creek	January 7, 1895	January 4, 1897	42nd
Gilbert Rutherford	Rep.	Lake Mills	January 4, 1897	January 2, 1899	43rd
Lewis Benson	Dem.	Oakland	January 2, 1899	January 2, 1905	44th 45th 46th
Charles Greenwood	Rep.	Lake Mills	January 2, 1905	January 7, 1907	47th
George W. Kindlin	Dem.	Koshkonong	January 7, 1907	January 2, 1911	48th 49th
Oscar F. Roessler	Dem.	Jefferson	January 2, 1911	January 4, 1915	50th 51st
Nelson H. Falk	Dem.	Lake Mills	January 4, 1915	January 1, 1917	52nd
William Everson	Dem.	Lake Mills	January 1, 1917	January 6, 1919	53rd
John W. Porter	Rep.	Oakland	January 6, 1919	January 3, 1921	54th
Henry William Stokes	Rep.	Waterloo	January 3, 1921	January 1, 1923	55th
District abolished by 1921 Wisconsin Act 470; Jefferson County was consolidated as a single-county Assembly district
