= Lorine =

Lorine is a given name. Notable people with the name include:

- Lorine Chebet (born 1999), Kenyan Olympic volleyball player
- Lorine Niedecker (1903–1970), American poet
- Lorine Pruette (1896–1976), American feminist, psychologist and writer
- Lorine Schild (born 2005), French figure skater
- Lorine Talhaoui (born 1983), Swedish singer

== See also ==
- Lorine Niedecker Cottage, in Blackhawk Island, Wisconsin, US
