= James Ostrander =

James Ostrander may refer to:

- James W. Ostrander, member of the Wisconsin State Assembly
- James H. Ostrander, member of the Wisconsin State Assembly
