= James W. Ostrander =

American politician (1825–1913)

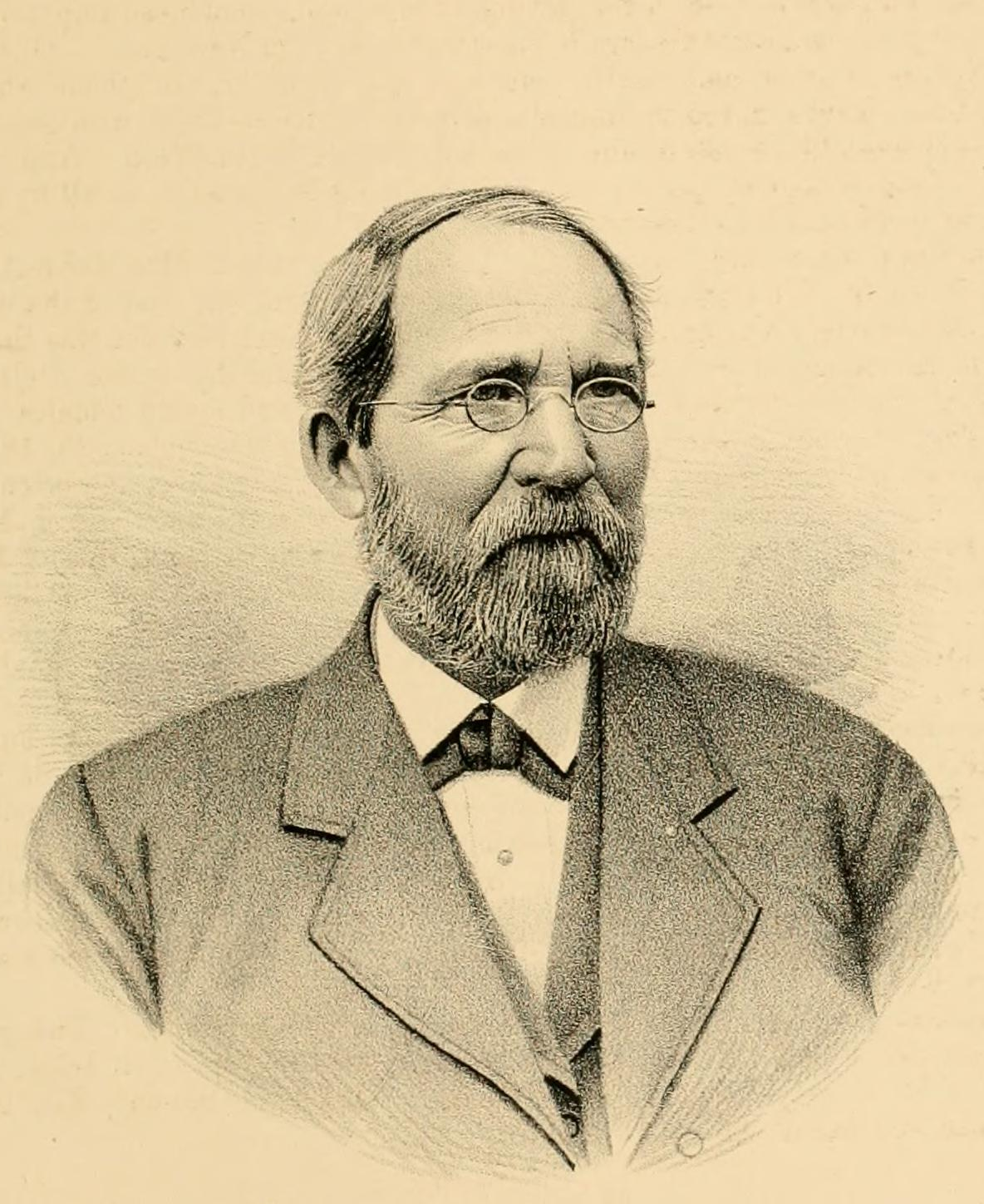
- Portrait from The History of Jefferson County, Wisconsin (1879)

Member of the Wisconsin State Assembly from the Jefferson 3rd district
- In office January 2, 1882 – January 1, 1883
- Preceded by: Samuel A. Craig
- Succeeded by: District abolished
- In office January 6, 1879 – January 5, 1880
- Preceded by: Hiram J. Ball
- Succeeded by: Samuel A. Craig
- In office January 4, 1875 – January 3, 1876
- Preceded by: Lucien B. Caswell
- Succeeded by: David Whitney Curtis
- In office January 6, 1873 – January 5, 1874
- Preceded by: Lucien B. Caswell
- Succeeded by: Lucien B. Caswell

Personal details
- Born: July 20, 1825 Clay, New York, U.S.
- Died: December 21, 1913 (aged 88) Knoxville, Tennessee, U.S.
- Resting place: Greenwood Cemetery, Knoxville, Tennessee
- Party: Republican
- Spouses: Sarah E. Ward (m. 1846; died 1855); Louisa R. Ostrander (m. 1856; died 1907)
- Children: with Sarah Ward; Frank Ostrander; Artemus W. Ostrander^{(b. 1848; died 1849)}; with Louisa Ostrander; Ellis Ostrander^{(b. 1856; died 1877)}; Nellie (Norton)^{(b. 1865; died 1934)}

James Warner Ostrander (July 20, 1825 – December 21, 1913) was an American furniture manufacturer, banker, and Republican politician. He served four non-consecutive terms (1873, 1875, 1879, 1882) in the Wisconsin State Assembly representing southern Jefferson County. He also served in several county offices in Jefferson County.

== Background ==
Ostrander was born in July 1825 (sources have differed on the exact date) in Clay, New York. He received a common school education, and came to Wisconsin in 1842, settling in Jefferson County, where he became a furniture manufacturer.

== Public office ==
He was elected county surveyor in 1846; county treasurer in 1849, and register of deeds in 1850. In 1872, he was elected to the 3rd Jefferson County Assembly district (the Towns of Cold Spring, Hebron, Jefferson, Koshkonong, Palmyra, Sullivan and Sumner), with 1,311 votes to 1,198 for former Republican Assemblyman William W. Reed, running on the Liberal Republican ticket (Republican incumbent Lucien Caswell was not a candidate). He was assigned to the standing committee on lumber and manufactures. He was not a candidate for re-election in 1873, and Caswell reclaimed the seat. Caswell was not a candidate in 1874, and Ostrander returned, receiving 1,318 votes for P. N. Waterbury (running on the Reform Party ticket. He was put on the committee on enrolled bills. He was not a candidate in 1875, and was succeeded by fellow Republican David Whitney Curtis. In 1878, Ostrander returned, defeating Democratic incumbent Hiram J. Ball with 1,308 votes to 1,115 for Ball. He was put on the committees on railroads and state affairs. He was not a candidate in 1879, and was succeeded by Democrat Samuel A. Craig.

== Later years ==
Ostrander moved to Knoxville, Tennessee, in 1897. In October 1905, he was in correspondence with the "Maunesha Chapter" of the Daughters of the American Revolution, in Waterloo, from his home in Knoxville, Tennessee.

He died as the result of a fall on December 21, 1913.

It is unclear what his relationship was to James H. Ostrander or to Jared F. Ostrander, who both served in the Assembly from Jefferson County (the latter being a pioneer settler of Aztalan) and came from New York state.
