= Charles Hammarquist =

Swedish-American farmer and politician (1822–1889)

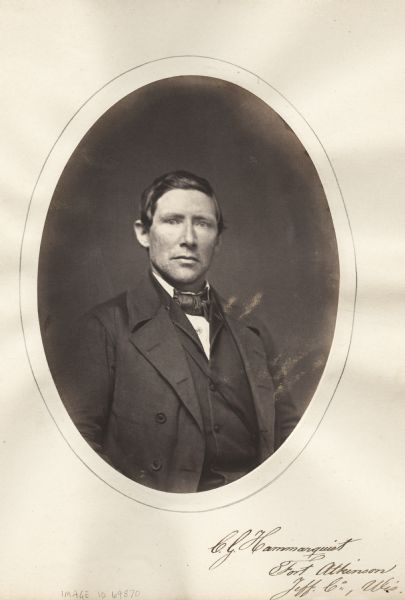
Charles G. Hammarquist

Charles G. Hammarquist (November 22, 1822 – December 3, 1889) was an American farmer, merchant and postmaster from Busseyville, Wisconsin, who served in the Wisconsin State Assembly.

== Background ==
He was born in Norrköping, Sweden on November 22, 1822, as Karl G. Hammarquist. His father was a wine merchant in Norrköping. Young Karl attended a select school, and received an extensive education before leaving school at age 16 to join his father's business. He stayed in the wine business until his father's death, but in 1840 took up farming near Stockholm.

He came to Wisconsin in August 1843 as part of a larger group of Swedes who stopped briefly in Pine Lake, Wisconsin before moving on to the Lake Koshkonong area to become a pioneer farmer. This group, (which included Thure Kumlien, later to become a notable naturalist) was described by one historian as "not farmers, but highly educated men who learned in time to clear forests and till the soil for homes in this new land." In September 1846 he married Josephina Maximiliana Eugenia Reuterskjold (born January 4, 1830, in Västergötland), another of that group.

== Public office ==
In 1849, he was elected a justice of the peace, a position he would hold until 1865. In 1857, he served one term as a member of the board of supervisors. When the Town of Sumner was organized, he was elected and served two terms as chairman of the city council (equivalent to a mayor), which again made him ex officio a member of the county board.

When elected in 1859 to the Assembly as a Republican from the 2nd Jefferson County district (the Towns of Koshkonong, Oakland, Lake Mills, Aztalan and Jefferson), he was the first immigrant Swede to be elected to the legislature of a Western state. He served on the standing committee on roads, bridges and ferries. He succeeded fellow Republican George C. Smith. He only served a single one-year term and was succeeded by Horace B. Willard, another Republican.

In 1865, he was appointed postmaster of Busseyville, and was still holding that office as of 1879.

== After the legislature ==
As of 1879, he owned a general store and was farming 140 acres. He and Josephine had nine children. He died December 3, 1889, and is buried in the Hammarquist family plot in the Busseyville Cemetery.
