= William Everson =

William Everson may refer to:

- William Everson (poet) (1912–1994), American poet of the San Francisco Renaissance
- William K. Everson (1929–1996), English-American film preservationist, historian and academic
- William G. Everson (1879–1954), United States Army general
- William Everson (Wisconsin politician) (1841–1928), American farmer and politician
- Bill Everson (William Aaron Everson, 1906–1966), Welsh rugby union player
