= Charles P. Goodrich =

American politician (1831–1921)

Chalres P. Goodrich

Member of the Wisconsin State Assembly from the Jefferson 2nd district
- In office January 6, 1868 – January 4, 1869
- Preceded by: Gustavus Bryant
- Succeeded by: Sylvester J. Conklin

Personal details
- Born: February 8, 1831 Stockbridge, New York, U.S.
- Died: January 21, 1921 (aged 89) Fort Atkinson, Wisconsin, U.S.
- Resting place: Evergreen Cemetery, Fort Atkinson
- Party: Republican
- Spouse: Frances DelGracia Bowen (m. 1855; died 1900)
- Children: William B. Goodrich^{(b. 1859; died 1934)}; Charles Leigh Goodrich^{(b. 1868; died 1938)}; DeWitt Goodrich^{(b. 1869; died 1958)}
- Occupation: Farmer, businessman

Military service
- Allegiance: United States
- Branch/service: United States Volunteers; Union Army
- Years of service: 1861–1865
- Rank: Sergeant Major
- Unit: 1st Reg. Wis. Vol. Cavalry
- Battles/wars: American Civil War

Charles Perry Goodrich (February 8, 1831 – January 21, 1921) was an American dairy farmer, businessman, Republican politician, and Wisconsin pioneer. He served one term in the Wisconsin State Assembly, representing Jefferson County's 2nd Assembly district during the 21st Wisconsin Legislature (1868). With fellow dairy farmer William D. James, he founded the James Manufacturing Company, which specialized in innovative equipment marketed to dairy farmers.

Wisconsin State Assembly
Preceded by Gustavus Bryant	Member of the Wisconsin State Assembly from the Jefferson 2nd district January 6, 1868 – January 4, 1869	Succeeded by Sylvester J. Conklin
