= Sumner, Jefferson County, Wisconsin =

Town of Sumner, Wisconsin
- Town
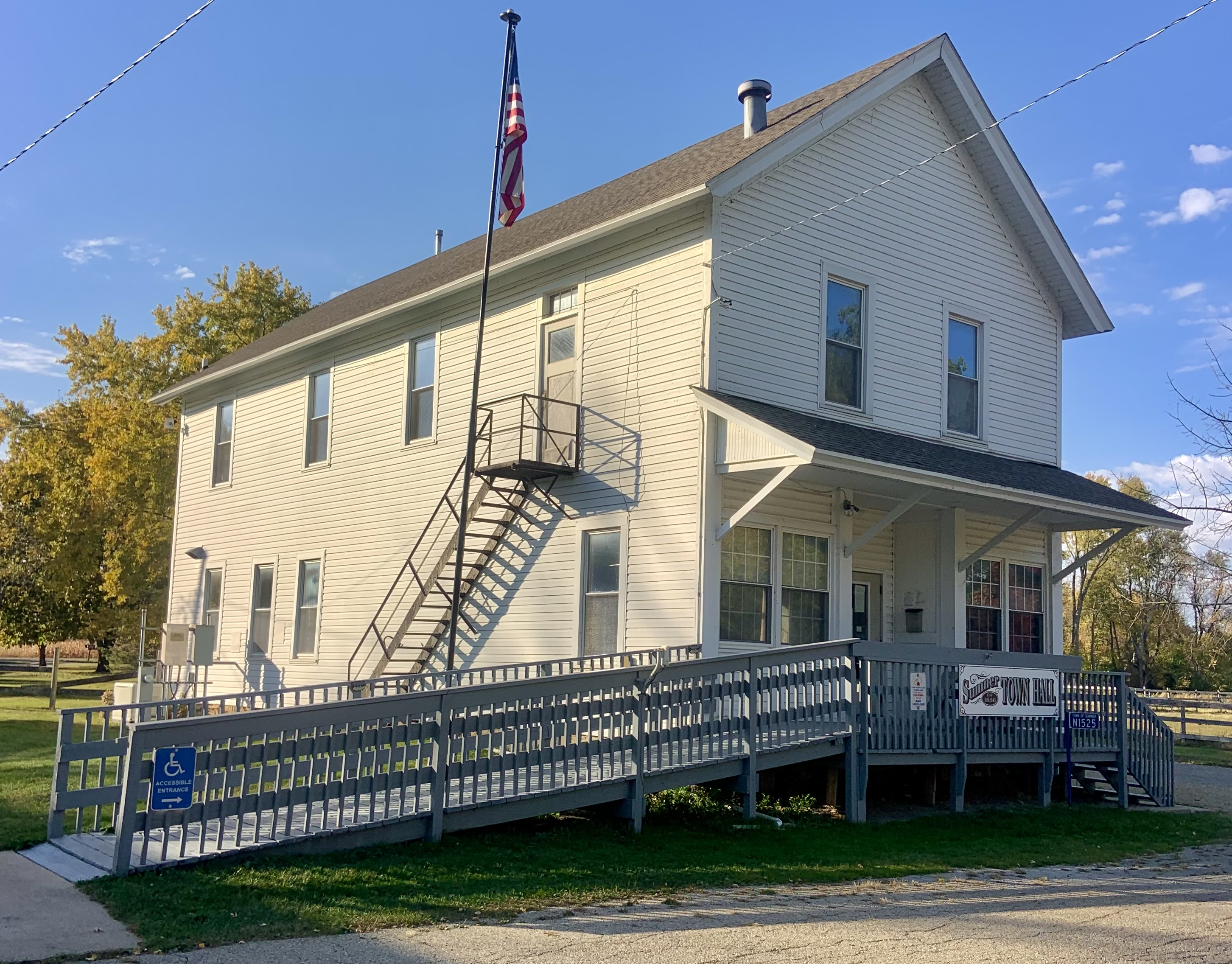
- Town hall in Busseyville

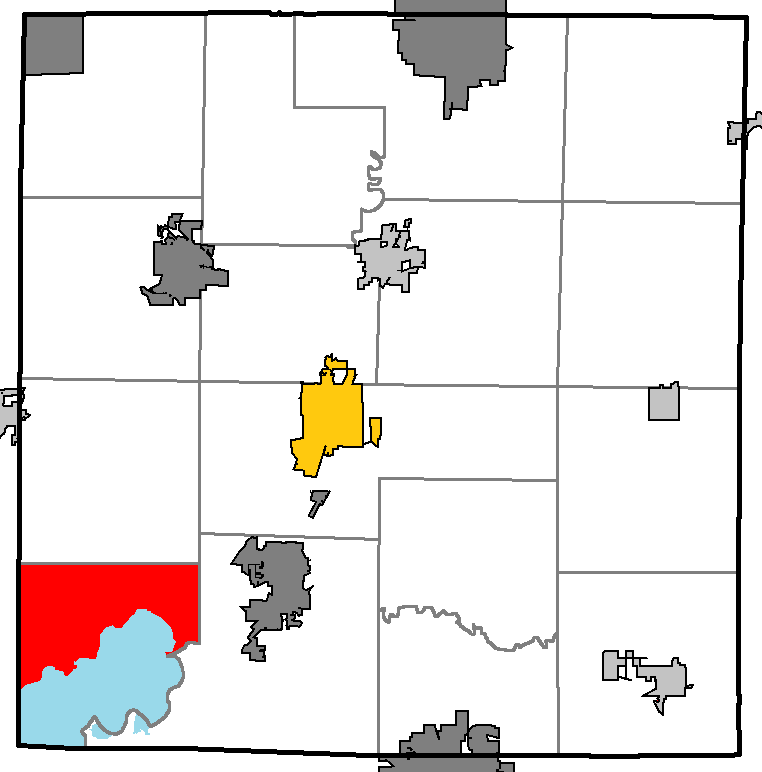
- Location of the Town of Sumner, within Jefferson County, Wisconsin
- Coordinates: 42°54′12″N 88°58′8″W
- Country: United States
- State: Wisconsin
- County: Jefferson

Area
  - Total: 31.3 sq mi (81.0 km^{2})
  - Land: 16.3 sq mi (42.2 km^{2})
  - Water: 15.0 sq mi (38.9 km^{2})
- Elevation: 774 ft (236 m)

Population (2020)
  - Total: 846
  - Density: 51.9/sq mi (20.0/km^{2})
- Time zone: UTC-6 (Central (CST))
  - Summer (DST): UTC-5 (CDT)
- FIPS code: 55-78475
- GNIS feature ID: 1584252
- Website: www.sumner-jc-wi.gov

Sumner is a town in Jefferson County, Wisconsin, United States. The population was 846 at the 2020 census. The census-designated place of Lake Koshkonong and the unincorporated communities of Busseyville, Carcajou, Glenn Oaks Beach, Koshkonong Manor, and North Shore are located within the town. The community of Blackhawk Island is located partially in the town.

== Geography ==
According to the United States Census Bureau, the town has a total area of 31.3 square miles (81.0 km^{2}), of which 16.3 square miles (42.2 km^{2}) is land and 15.0 square miles (38.9 km^{2}), or 47.97%, is water.

== Demographics ==
As of the census of 2000, there were 904 people, 370 households, and 259 families residing in the town. The population density was 55.5 people per square mile (21.4/km^{2}). There were 555 housing units at an average density of 34.1 per square mile (13.2/km^{2}). The racial makeup of the town was 98.89% White, 0.33% Native American, 0.22% Asian, 0.11% Pacific Islander, and 0.44% from two or more races. Hispanic or Latino of any race were 0.33% of the population.

There were 370 households, out of which 25.4% had children under the age of 18 living with them, 60.0% were married couples living together, 4.6% had a female householder with no husband present, and 30.0% were non-families. 23.2% of all households were made up of individuals, and 13.5% had someone living alone who was 65 years of age or older. The average household size was 2.44 and the average family size was 2.85.

In the town, the population was spread out, with 19.9% under the age of 18, 7.0% from 18 to 24, 27.0% from 25 to 44, 30.0% from 45 to 64, and 16.2% who were 65 years of age or older. The median age was 43 years. For every 100 females, there were 112.2 males. For every 100 females age 18 and over, there were 104.5 males.

The median income for a household in the town was $51,250, and the median income for a family was $56,944. Males had a median income of $34,773 versus $25,000 for females. The per capita income for the town was $25,416. About 2.1% of families and 3.5% of the population were below the poverty line, including 4.1% of those under age 18 and 4.1% of those age 65 or over.

== Notable people ==
- Charles Hammarquist, farmer, merchant, postmaster and state legislator
- Ludwig Kumlien, Thure Kumlien's son; born at the family farm in Busseyville, rose to fame as an ornithologist and professor at Milton College
- Thure Kumlien, Swedish-American ornithologist lived on a farm near Busseyville in the town

== Attractions ==
Sumner borders Lake Koshkonong, one of the larger lakes in Wisconsin. Sumner is also known for having a large number of Indian mounds.
