= Austin Kellogg =

Member of the Wisconsin State Assembly

Austin Kellogg (1814-1895) was a farmer in Concord, Wisconsin, who served three terms as a member of the Wisconsin State Assembly from Jefferson County.

== Early years ==
Kellogg was born on October 1, 1814, in New Hartford, Connecticut. He had an academic education, and became a farmer. He and his wife Laura moved to Wisconsin between 1842 and 1844 (sources differ), coming first to Milwaukee but settling in Concord. He was first elected to the Wisconsin State Assembly for the 1850 session from the second Jefferson County Assembly district as a Democrat, succeeding Whig Jarvis K. Pike. He would be succeeded in the next year by fellow Democrat Patrick Rogan.

In March 1850, when the new "Waukesha, Jefferson County and Madison Plank and Turnpike Road Company" which the legislature had just chartered held its organizing meeting, Kellogg was chosen to chair the meeting, and was elected to the initial board of directors. He spent some years on the county board of supervisors representing the Town of Concord; and served not only as chairman of the town board, but on at least one occasion was elected a justice of the peace.

In 1853, Kellogg was the sheriff of Jefferson County; and the lieutenant colonel of the Third Regiment (Jefferson County) of the Wisconsin State Militia. He was again elected Sheriff for 1868. In late November 1872, accusations were levied that Kellogg and another local Democrat had been provided unsolicited pre-approved declaration of intent ("first papers") forms by the county clerk, by means of which non-citizens had been fraudulently permitted to vote in the recent election.

== Return to the Assembly ==
In 1873 he was again elected to the Assembly from the 2nd Jefferson County district (now consisting the Towns of Aztalan, Farmington, Concord, Lake Mills, Milford, Oakland, and Waterloo, and the village of Waterloo) with 842 votes to 460 for Republican Stephen Faville. He became chairman of the standing committee on agriculture. He was re-elected in 1874 as a Democratic-Reform candidate, with 990 votes to 697 for Republican John Spencer. He transferred to the committee on railroads.

== Private life ==
For many years, Kellogg and his wife owned and managed a hotel in Concord called the Western Hotel or Kellogg's tavern. He died on October 22, 1895, and is buried in Concord Center Cemetery with his wife Laura A. Kellogg, who died at their Concord home in 1916 at the age of 90.

== Identity ==
Kellogg is not to be confused with the Austin Kellogg who was an 1830s pioneer in Pike Creek, later Southport, later still Kenosha; nor with the Austin Kellogg of the 1850s who was a farmer in Princeton, Wisconsin.
