= George C. Smith (Wisconsin politician) =

American politician

George C. Smith was an American farmer from Oakland, Wisconsin who spent two terms as a member of the Wisconsin State Assembly. He was a Republican.

== Background ==
He was born in New York state, and was 33 years old when the Assembly session commenced.

== Legislature ==
He was elected in 1857 from the 2nd Jefferson County district (the Towns of Koshkonong, Oakland, Lake Mills, Aztalan and Jefferson), and re-elected in 1858. He succeeded fellow Republican Jared F. Ostrander, and was succeeded by Charles Hammarquist, another Republican.
