= Star Cinema (theater) =

Movie theater chain operating in Wisconsin and Iowa, United States

- Company type: Subsidiary
- Parent: AGT Enterprises, Inc.
- Website: starcinema.com

Star Cinema was a movie theater chain owned by AGT Enterprises, Inc., of Prairie du Chien, Wisconsin, with nine locations in the states of Iowa and Wisconsin in the United States of America. Altogether, the chain's nine locations included 95 total movie screens, including Wisconsin's only IMAX theater at the Fitchburg location. Eight of the nine theaters were built by Star Cinema, the exception being the Hilldale Theater in Madison, Wisconsin, which was acquired in 2000.

In January 2008, AGT enterprises sold six of the seven remaining Star Cinema Locations to Kerasotes ShowPlace Theatres. AGT continued to operating the Prairie du Chien theater until selling it to Elkader Cinema of Elkader, IA.

== Notable features ==
The Star Cinema chain uses large, decorated lobbies usually centered on a theme in all new theatres; for example, the Dubuque location's lobby is based on the Mississippi River, with a riverboat mural and river rock accents. Mints are served by an usher after every movie.

== Locations ==
- Reedsburg, Wisconsin - Opened in 1992 - 6 Screens. Sold to Kerasotes. Closed in 2018.
- Prairie du Chien, Wisconsin - Opened in 1994 - 6 Screens. Sold to Elkader Cinema.
- Sparta, Wisconsin - Opened in 1995 - 6 Screens. Sold to Rogers Cinema.
- Johnson Creek, Wisconsin - Opened in 1997 - 12 Screens. Sold to Kerasotes
- Wisconsin Dells, Wisconsin - Opened in 1999 - 15 Screens. Sold to Kerasotes
- Fitchburg, Wisconsin - Opened in 1999 - 18 Screens (Three screens and an IMAX theater added in 2005). Sold to Kerasotes
- Madison, Wisconsin - Hilldale Theater - Acquired in 2000 - 2 Screens. Closed and demolished during the Hilldale renovation. Replaced by the Sundance 608.
- Council Bluffs, Iowa - Opened in September 2003 - 16 Screens (An IMAX theater was scheduled to open in 2008). Sold to Kerasotes
- Dubuque, Iowa - Opened in July 2005 - 14 Screens Sold to Kerasotes
