= Jared F. Ostrander =

American politician

Jared Fordham Ostrander (September 1805 – November 19, 1874) was a pioneer farmer and minister from Aztalan, Wisconsin who helped organize the Free Soil Party in Wisconsin, served a single one-year term in the Wisconsin State Assembly and moved to Mantorville, Minnesota, where he became a judge.

== Background ==
Son of Peter and Clarissa (Fordham) Ostrander, Jared was baptized at the Reformed Dutch Church of New Hurley in New Hurley, New York on September 13, 1805. As a boy, he moved with his parents to Pompey, New York and became a member of the local Congregational Church on March 1, 1827. On July 7, 1834, he married Rowena Wells, daughter of Asa Wells, at the Wells' home on Pompey Hill. He trained for the ministry, and was ordained by the Central Evangelical Association of New York (an organization accused of perfectionism and "unionism") on July 8, 1835.

== Early Wisconsin years ==
Early in 1836, Ostrander preached on Sundays in Milwaukee from house to house for six months, and tried to organize a non-denominational church, but failed. Ostrander was part of a group of people from New York state who came to Aztalan in the Wisconsin Territory in November 1836, coming from Milwaukee in wagons and a skiff. He taught the first school in Aztalan during winter months, and his wife was employed to teach younger students in the summer. He was part of a team who made the village plat for Aztalan in 1841.

In 1839, Ostrander was the first to register his ordination papers in Jefferson County. For four or five years, he was the only pastor in the county authorized to solemnize marriages. In an 1871 letter back to his old home town of Pompey, New York, Ostrander claimed to have, "[p]reached the first sermon ever preached in Madison, the Capitol of Wisconsin, standing behind a dry goods box covered with an Indian blanket, in the upper story of a store, the best meeting house the place could afford."

== Political affairs ==
On October 25, 1852, a meeting of Jefferson County "Free Democrats" was held in Jefferson. Ostrander was elected secretary, and elected to the county committee. The resolutions passed opposed the Compromise of 1850 and endorsed Free Soil Party candidates for President and local office alike. In 1854, Ostrander was defeated in a run for county register of deeds, running as a Republican.

In 1856 he was elected for the 2nd Jefferson County Assembly district (the Towns of Koshkonong, Oakland, Lake Mills, Aztalan and Jefferson) for the 1857 term. He was succeeded by fellow Republican George C. Smith.

In later years, he moved to Mantorville, Minnesota, where he was elected a probate judge, a position he held until his death on November 19, 1874.

== Further information ==
It is unclear what relationship Ostrander bore to James H. Ostrander and James W. Ostrander, both of whom were roughly his contemporaries, represented Jefferson County in the Assembly, and were from the Aztalan-Jefferson-Waterloo area.

Various papers relating to Ostrander's family and Asa Wells' family are in the archives of the University of Washington in Seattle, Washington.
