= Nelson H. Falk =

20th century American lawyer and politician

N. H. Falk

Member of the Wisconsin State Assembly from the Jefferson 2nd district
- In office January 4, 1915 – January 1, 1917
- Preceded by: Oscar F. Roessler
- Succeeded by: William Everson

Personal details
- Born: March 24, 1874
- Died: October 31, 1924 (aged 50)
- Cause of death: Pneumonia
- Resting place: Riverside Cemetery, Stoughton, Wisconsin
- Party: Democratic
- Spouse: Helen Devine
- Profession: Lawyer

Nelson Hadley Falk (March 24, 1874 – October 31, 1924) was an American lawyer and Democratic politician from Jefferson County, Wisconsin. He represented Jefferson County in the Wisconsin State Assembly during the 1915 session. His name was often abbreviated as N. H. Falk; the 1915 Wisconsin Blue Book incorrectly named him as M. H. Falk.

== Biography ==
Falk practiced law in Lake Mills, Wisconsin. He graduated from the University of Wisconsin Law School in 1896. He served in the Wisconsin State Assembly in 1915 and was a Democrat. Falk died of pneumonia in Lake Mills, Wisconsin.

Wisconsin State Assembly
Preceded by Oscar F. Roessler	Member of the Wisconsin State Assembly from the Jefferson 2nd district January 4, 1915 – January 1, 1917	Succeeded by William Everson
