= Johnson Creek (Rock River tributary) =

Location
- Country: United States
- State: Wisconsin
- City: Watertown, Johnson Creek

Physical characteristics
- Source
  - coordinates: 43.179°N 88.705°W
- Mouth
  - coordinates: 43.072°N 88.793°W
- Length: 20.8 mi (33.5 km)
- Basin size: 45.22 mi^{2} (117.1 km^{2})

Basin features
- River system: Rock River (Mississippi River)

Johnson Creek is a minor tributary of the Rock River, about 20.8 miles (33.5 km) long, in southeastern Wisconsin in the United States. Via the Rock River, it is part of the watershed of the Mississippi River. Its watershed lies entirely within Jefferson County.

== Course ==
Johnson Creek rises in northern Jefferson County within the city limits of Watertown and follows a J-shaped course through the northern half of the county. Upon entering the city of Johnson Creek from the south, it turns sharply to the west and flows into the Rock River on the west end of the city, near where County Road B crosses the Rock River.

Numerous small streams empty into the creek, and there is one recognized lake in the watershed. The 4.2-acre (1.7 ha) lake is officially unnamed, but is locally called Lake Dorothy. Portions of the creek and its many small branches are channelized.

The watershed, including the majority of Farmington and portions of Watertown, Concord, Jefferson, and Aztalan, is mostly rural. U.S. Route 18 passes along the southern edge of the watershed, and Interstate 94 crosses through it from east to west.

== Geography ==
The region is predominantly agricultural, with some wetlands, grassland, and forested areas. The Wisconsin DNR labels the majority of the land type as the Watertown drumlins: "the landform pattern is undulating till plain with drumlins, lake plains, and muck areas common. Soils are predominantly moderately well drained silt and loam over calcareous sandy loam till or silty, loamy and clayey lacustrine." Small portions are associated with the Jefferson Lake Plains; the entire area is contained within the southeast glacial plains. The original vegetation cover is primarily sugar maple, basswood, red oak, white oak, and black oak, with smaller areas of swamp conifers, lowland hardwoods, and marsh and sedge meadow with lowland shrubs.

Johnson Creek is part of the larger Upper Rock River Basin. The 81.86 miles (130 km) of streams comprising the Johnson Creek watershed cover 45.22 square miles (117 km^{2}), or 28939 acres, with 20.38 acres covered by lakes and 5226.41 acres of wetlands.

== Conservation ==
The creek's watershed includes extensive forested and shrub wetlands, most of which are listed as potentially restorable and 28 acres (11 ha) of which have been restored. An infestation of rusty crayfish has plagued the creek's entire length for some years, and another noted aquatic invasive is reed canary grass along much of the watershed's wetlands. Its entire course is also listed as impaired due to nonpoint sources and destabilization of the creek's banks, leading to contamination by sediment and suspended solids. This signifies that the water quality does not allow the creek to meet its designated use, necessitating a water quality improvement plan. The creek's total maximum daily load planning is still in development.

A small stretch of the creek is designated wadable nursery waters for smallmouth bass by the Wisconsin DNR, but the creek's rated condition for fish and aquatic life is poor as of 2008. Additionally, Jefferson County has been granted a Lake Protection Grant which includes the Johnson Creek watershed. There are seven DNR managed lands, most of which are extensive wildlife habitats.

== See also ==
- List of rivers of Wisconsin
