= Blackhawk Island, Wisconsin =

- Unincorporated community
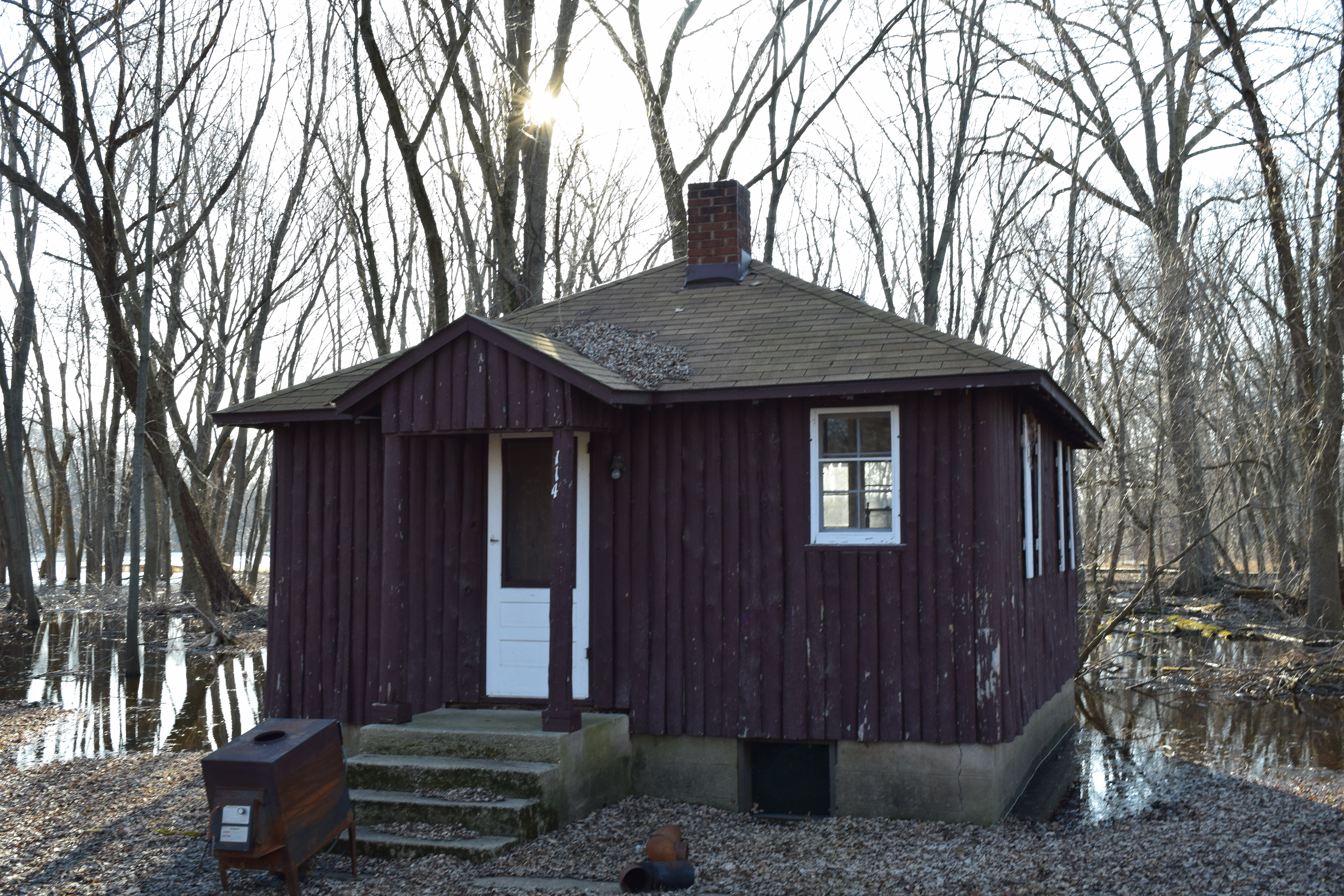
- Lorine Niedecker Cottage in Blackhawk Island

- Location within Wisconsin Location within the United States
- Coordinates: 42°53′54″N 88°53′32″W
- Country: United States
- State: Wisconsin
- County: Jefferson
- Towns: Koshkonong, Sumner
- Elevation: 781 ft (238 m)
- Time zone: UTC-6 (Central (CST))
  - Summer (DST): UTC-5 (CDT)
- Area code: 920
- GNIS feature ID: 1561899

Blackhawk Island is an unincorporated community located in the towns of Koshkonong and Sumner, Jefferson County, Wisconsin, United States. Its best known longtime resident was the poet, Lorine Niedecker.
