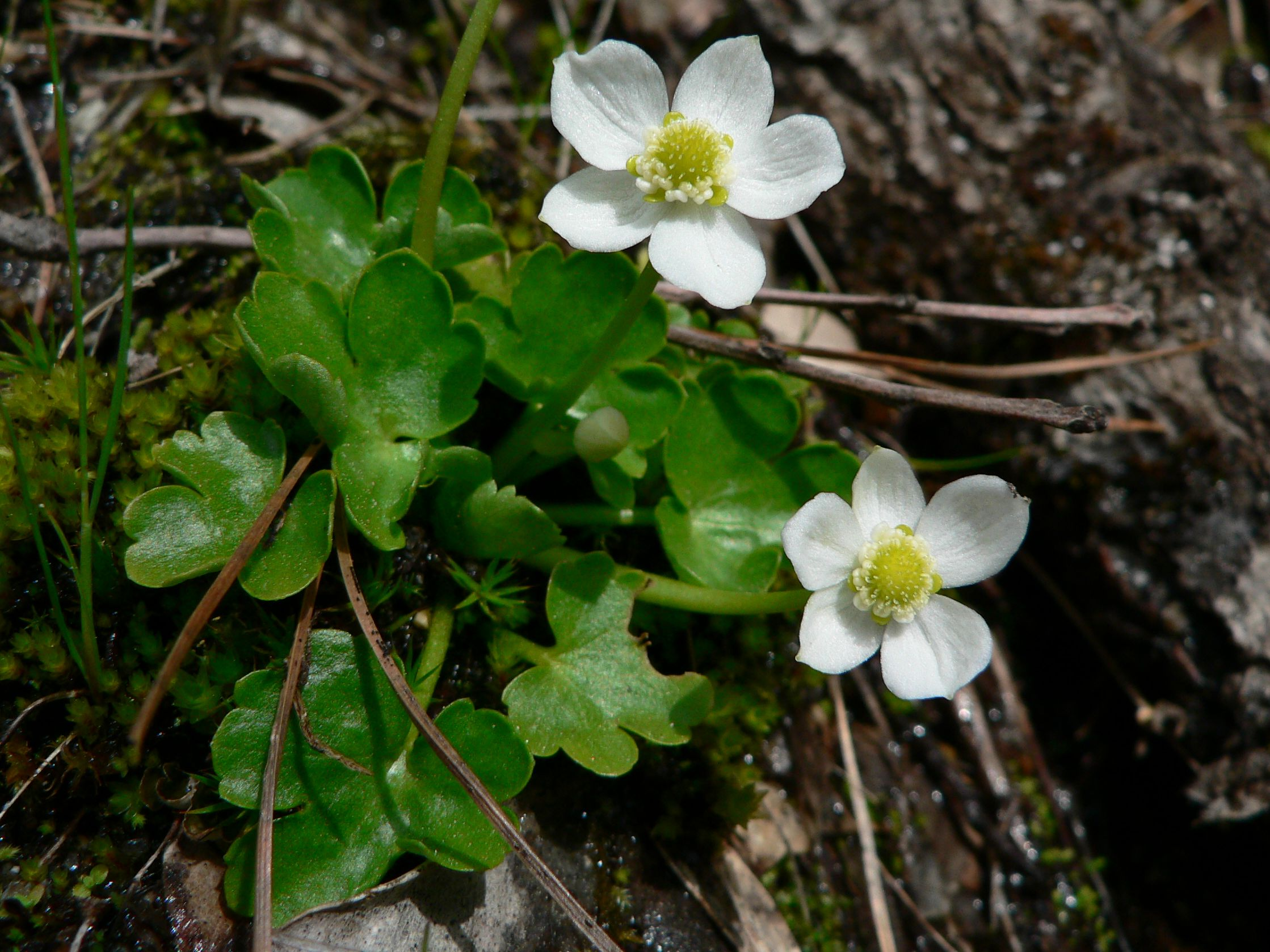

Scientific classification
- Kingdom: Plantae
- Clade: Tracheophytes
- Clade: Angiosperms
- Clade: Eudicots
- Order: Ranunculales
- Family: Ranunculaceae
- Genus: Kumlienia
- Species: K. hystricula

Binomial name
- Kumlienia hystricula (Gray) Greene

= Kumlienia hystricula =

Species of flowering plant

Kumlienia hystricula (formerly Ranunculus hystriculus) is a species of flowering plant in the buttercup family known by the common name waterfall false buttercup.

== Description ==
Kumlienia hystricula is a small perennial herb growing from fleshy roots and a thick caudex. It produces a basal rosette of hairless green leaves which are rounded with several round lobes. Each leaf is one to three centimeters wide and is borne on a long petiole. From the patch emerge several inflorescences on erect to drooping peduncles up to about 20 centimeters (7.9 in) tall. Each flower has 5 or 6 white sepals which look like petals. The actual petals are much smaller, shiny yellow-green structures curving around the center of the bloom. There are many stamens and pistils in the center. The fruits are bristly, lance-shaped bodies a few millimeters long and clustered together.

== Distribution ==
Kumlienia hystricula is endemic to the Sierra Nevada in California, where it grows in wet areas in the coniferous forests of the range.
