= Charles Greenwood (Wisconsin politician) =

American politician

Charles F. Greenwood (May 6, 1852 – May 3, 1925) was an American businessman and politician.

Born in the town of Aztalan, Jefferson County, Wisconsin, Greenwood grew up a farm, went to the public schools, and the Jefferson Liberal Institute. He owned a farm and a grocery store in Johnson Creek, Wisconsin. He was also president of the Lake Mills State Bank in Lake Mills, Wisconsin. Greenwood served on the Jefferson Board of Supervisors and was chairman of the county board. In 1905, Greenwood served in the Wisconsin State Assembly and was a Republican. Greenwood died in a hospital in Battle Creek, Michigan.
