= Busseyville, Wisconsin =

- Unincorporated community
- Location within Wisconsin Location within the United States
- Coordinates: 42°53′55″N 088°59′16″W
- Country: United States
- State: Wisconsin
- County: Jefferson
- Town: Sumner
- Elevation: 791 ft (241 m)
- Time zone: UTC-6 (Central (CST))
  - Summer (DST): UTC-5 (CDT)
- Area code: 920
- GNIS feature ID: 1561899

Busseyville is an unincorporated community in the town of Sumner, Jefferson County, Wisconsin, United States. It is located on Wisconsin Highway 106 near Luna Road, about ten miles west of Fort Atkinson. The Sumner town hall is located there, as well as Busseyville Community Church.

== Notable people ==
The Swedish-American ornithologist Thure Kumlien lived on a farm near Busseyville, as did other Swedes who had come in the same group with Kumlien, such as Charles Hammarquist, farmer, merchant, state legislator and postmaster of the Busseyville post office. Kumlien's son, Ludwig Kumlien, born at the family farm in Busseyville, rose to fame as an ornithologist and professor at Milton College.
