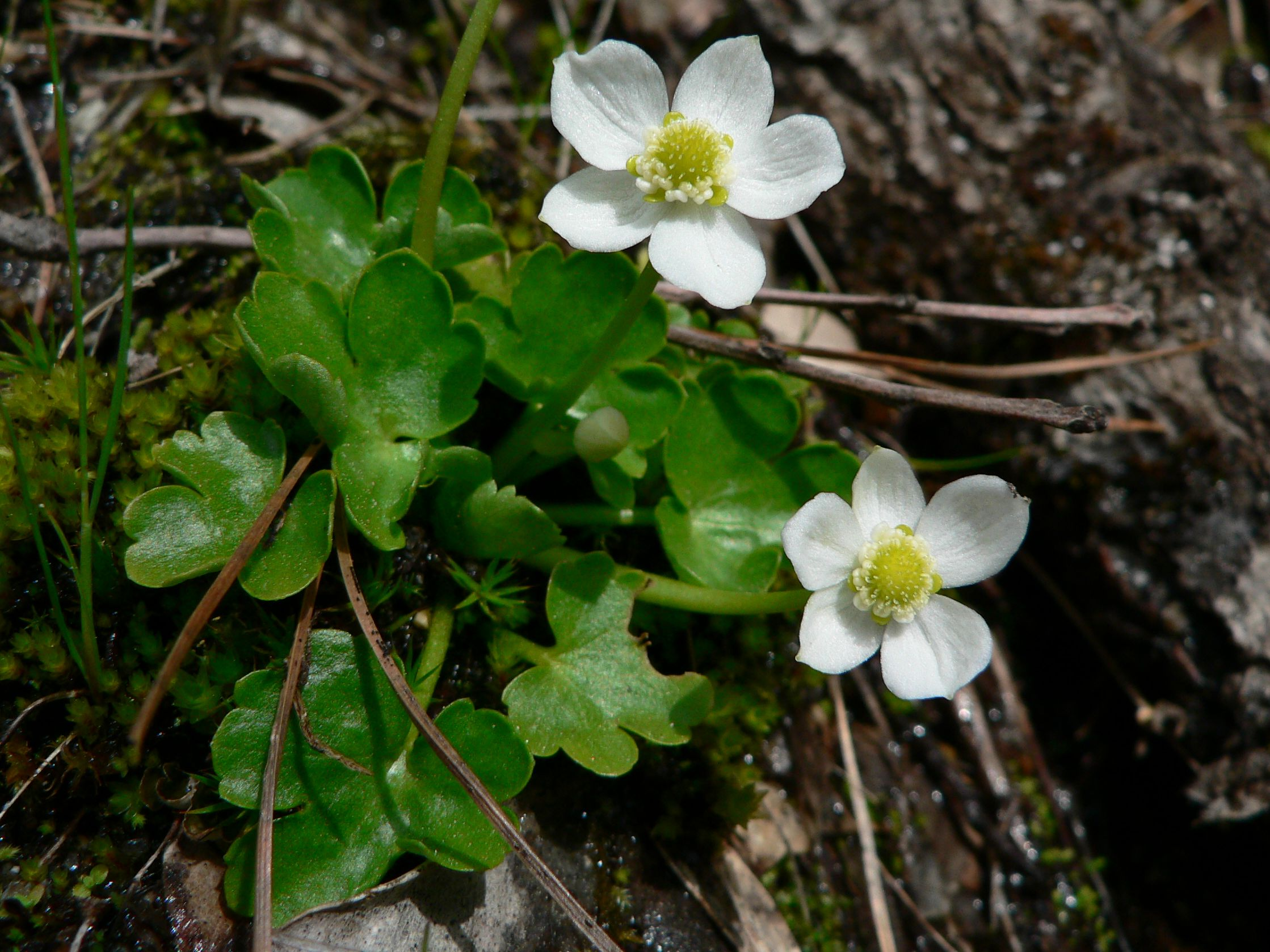
- Kumlienia hystricula

Scientific classification
- Kingdom: Plantae
- Clade: Embryophytes
- Clade: Tracheophytes
- Clade: Spermatophytes
- Clade: Angiosperms
- Clade: Eudicots
- Order: Ranunculales
- Family: Ranunculaceae
- Tribe: Ranunculeae
- Genus: Kumlienia; Greene

Species
- Kumlienia cooleyae Kumlienia hystricula

= Kumlienia =

Genus of flowering plants

Kumlienia is a small genus of flowering plants in the buttercup family known generally as false buttercups. There are two species in this genus, both of which were formerly included in Ranunculus. Kumlienia cooleyae is native to the northwestern Pacific coast of North America from Alaska to Washington. Kumlienia hystricula is endemic to the Sierra Nevada of California. These perennial herbs produce a basal rosette of leaves on a caudex and erect inflorescences of a few yellow or white buttercup flowers.

The genus is named for the Swedish-American naturalist Thure Kumlien.
