= Palmer F. Daugs =

American politician

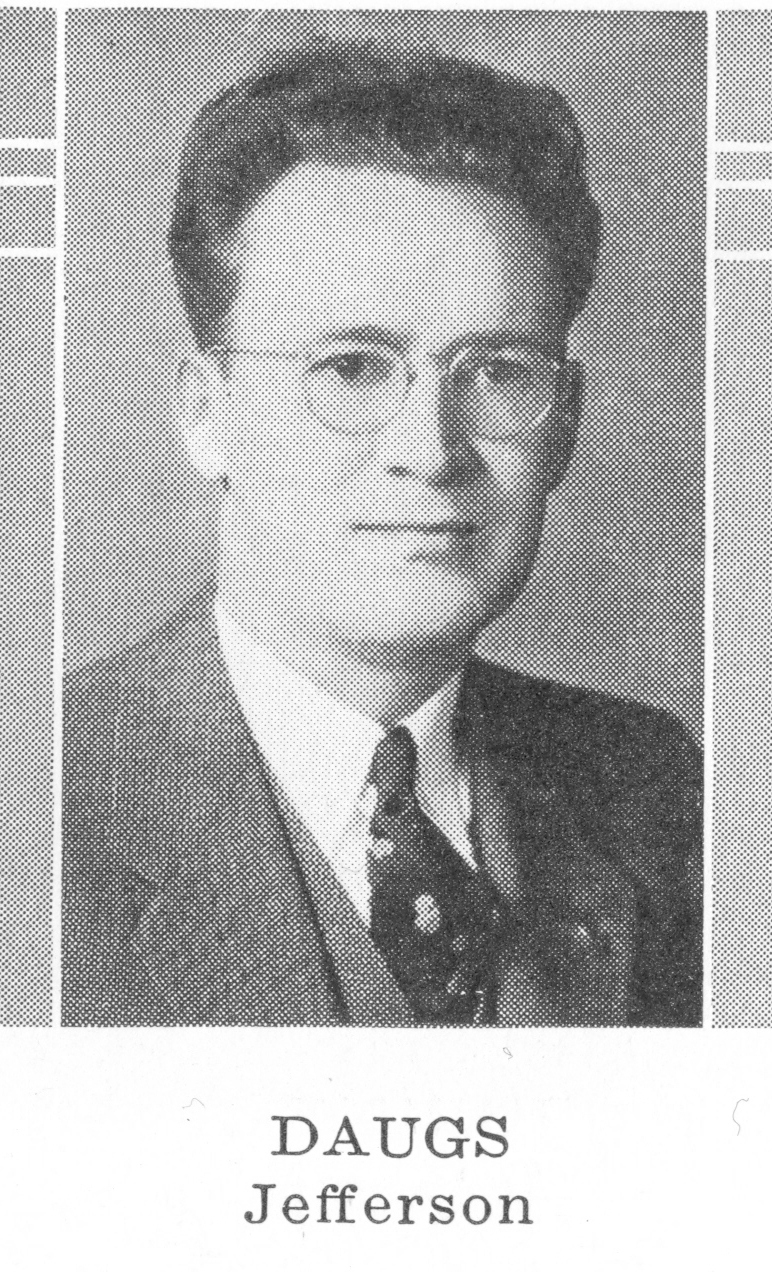
Palmer F. Daugs

Palmer F. Daugs was a member of the Wisconsin State Assembly.

== Biography ==
Daugs was born on February 10, 1903, in Farmington, Jefferson County, Wisconsin. He attended high school in Fort Atkinson, Wisconsin, as well as Marquette University. Daugs went on to become Vice Chairman of the local chapter of the American Red Cross. He died on July 22, 1980, and is buried in Lake Mills, Wisconsin.

== Career ==
Daugs was a member of the Assembly from 1933 to 1946. Later, he was an unsuccessful candidate for the Wisconsin State Senate in 1954 and for the Assembly in 1956. He was a Democrat.
