= Carcajou, Wisconsin =

- Unincorporated community
- Location within Wisconsin Location within the United States
- Coordinates: 42°53′23″N 88°57′43″W
- Country: United States
- State: Wisconsin
- County: Jefferson
- Town: Sumner
- Elevation: 801 ft (244 m)
- Time zone: UTC-6 (Central (CST))
  - Summer (DST): UTC-5 (CDT)
- Area code: 920
- GNIS feature ID: 1562713

Carcajou is an unincorporated community located in the town of Sumner, Jefferson County, Wisconsin, United States.

The word carcajou is Canadian French for "wolverine".
