= James H. Ostrander =

American politician

James H. Ostrander was a farmer from Waterloo, Wisconsin who served a single term as a member of the Wisconsin State Assembly from a Jefferson County district comprising the Towns of Waterloo, Milford, Lake Mills and Oakland.

== Early years in Wisconsin ==
Ostrander came to what was then Aztalan township in the Wisconsin Territory in 1842, settling in Section 18. He helped organize Waterloo as a separate town in 1845 or 1846, and served as its first superintendent of schools.

== Legislative service ==
At the time of his service in the Assembly, he was 55 years old, a native of New York state and had been in Wisconsin for 10 years. He was assigned to the standing committee on internal improvements. He was a Whig.

It is unclear what his relationship is to James W. Ostrander or to Jared F. Ostrander, who both also served in the Assembly from Jefferson County.
