= Jarvis K. Pike =

American jurist and politician

Jarvis K. Pike (December 19, 1781 – January 16, 1863) was an American attorney, judge and politician who served in local offices, and in the state legislatures, first in New York (state) and then in Cold Spring, Wisconsin.

== Background ==
Pike was born December 19, 1781, in Dutchess County, New York, son of Jesse and Rebecca King Pike.

== Public life ==
Pike represented Chenango County, New York at the second (1821) state constitutional convention. He was one of the three members of the New York State Assembly from that county for two one-year terms, 1830–31. He served as county clerk for Chenango from November 1830 to November 1834. In April 1831, he was one of the signatories of an anti-Masonic "Address to the People of New-York" opposing the supposed malign influence of Freemasonry on New York and national politics. In 1836, he was the Whig designee for the New York's 21st congressional district presidential elector. He spent some years as a county judge for Cortland County, New York before removing to Wisconsin Territory.

In 1848, Pike was the Whig nominee for Wisconsin State Senate from Jefferson County for the 1st Wisconsin Legislature in 1848, losing to Democrat Myron B. Williams. At that time, he was already living in Cold Spring. He was elected in November 1848 to the Wisconsin State Assembly from Jefferson County's Second Assembly district for the 2nd Wisconsin Legislature of 1849, succeeding Democrat Peter H. Turner. Contemporary reports claim that he won because Democrats in the neighboring Town of Ixonia were given ballots for the wrong Assembly district, and cast invalid votes for Benjamin Nute, thus causing Pike to win by a twenty-vote margin in this predominantly Democratic district. He was succeeded in the Assembly for 1850 by Democrat Austin Kellogg.

In 1850, Pike was a justice of the peace in Cold Spring. In 1852, Pike was elected one of the vice-presidents of the newly organized "Jefferson and Dodge County Agricultural Society."

By 1860, Pike had become a Republican, and served as a delegate to the county convention of that party in September.

== Private life ==
He died January 16, 1863, and is buried in Oak Grove Cemetery in Whitewater, Wisconsin along with his wife Rebecca Mead Pike (1781–1867).
