= Amy Kellogg Morse =

American teacher, abolitionist, temperance lecturer/leader (1853–1905)

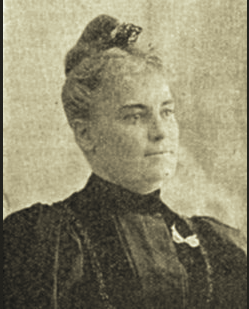
- Portrait photo from Our Church Life, 1897
- Born: Amy Cornelia Kellogg; March 18, 1853; Lake Mills, Wisconsin, U.S.
- Died: December 20, 1905 (aged 52); Spring Valley, Wisconsin, U.S.
- Education: Northwestern University
- Occupations: teacher; abolitionist; temperance lecturer
- Known for: President, Wisconsin State Woman's Christian Temperance Union
- Spouse: Edgar L. Morse (m. 1877)

Amy Kellogg Morse (March 18, 1853 – December 20, 1905) was an American teacher, abolitionist, and temperance lecturer. She served as President of the Wisconsin State Woman's Christian Temperance Union (WCTU).

== Biography ==
Amy Cornelia Kellogg was born at Lake Mills, Wisconsin, March 18, 1853.

She was educated in the public schools and at Fort Atkinson, Wisconsin High School. She continued her studies at Northwestern University (Ph.B., 1875).

From 1876 through 1884, Morese was a teacher in high schools in Beaver Dam, Janesville, La Crosse and Sparta, Wisconsin.

Through the influence of Frances Willard, Morse affiliated with the WCTU. She attended her first State convention at Sparta, Wisconsin in 1883 and was there elected recording secretary. From 1883, and for several years, she gave all of her time to lecturing and organizing local Unions in Wisconsin. In 1884, she was elected president of the Wisconsin WCTU at Waukesha, Wisconsin in which capacity she served for eight years. Morse was a contributor to temperance periodicals.

In 1899, she preached at Fifield's church every alternate Sunday.

== Personal life ==
On November 22, 1877, she married the Rev. Edgar L. Morse, a Congregational minister.

== Death and legacy ==
Amy Kellogg Morse died of pneumonia at Spring Valley, Wisconsin, December 20, 1905.

The town of Amy in Dunn County, Wisconsin is named in her honor.
