= Lorine Niedecker Cottage =

House in Wisconsin

- U.S. National Register of Historic Places
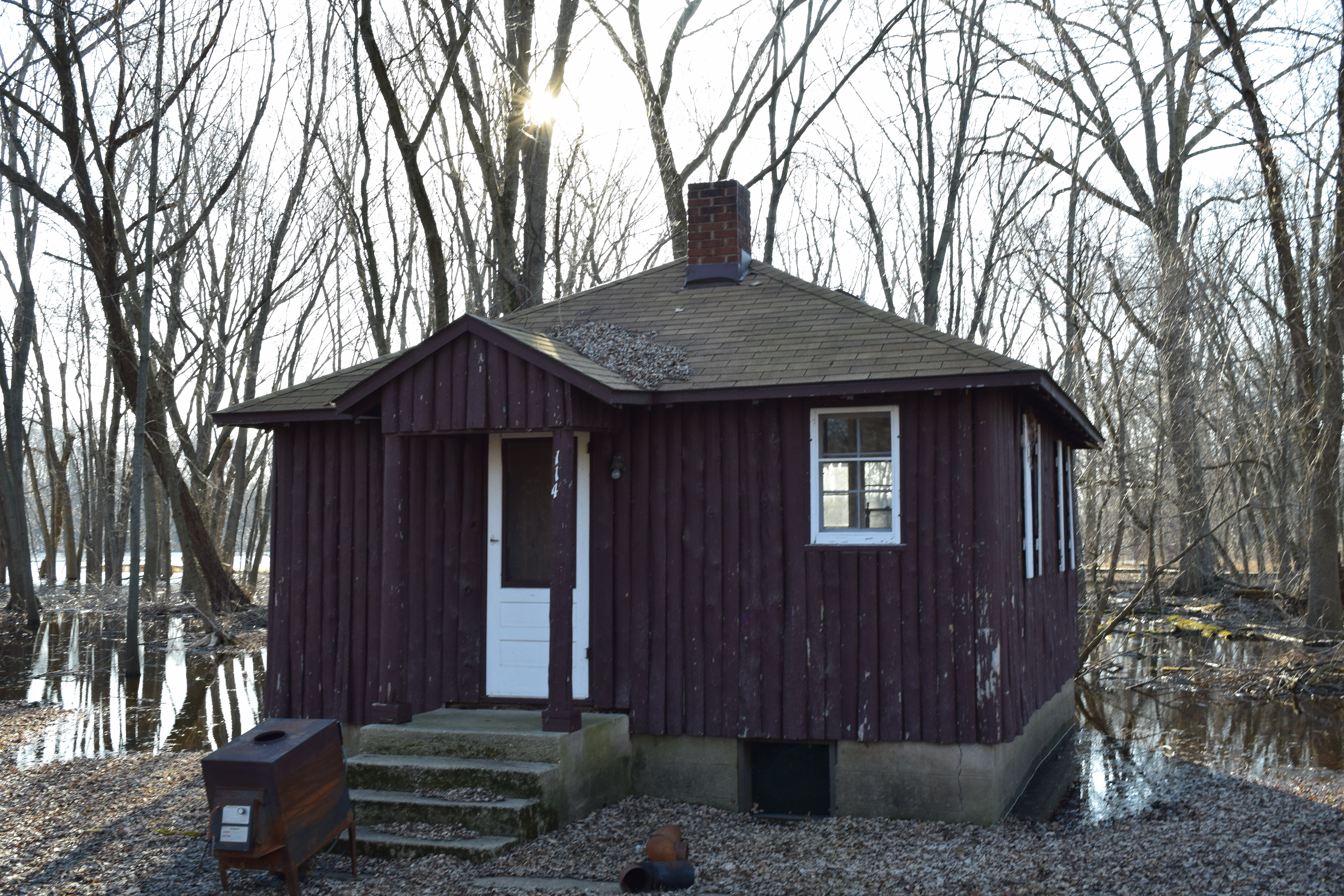
- Lorine Niedecker Cottage
- Location: W7307 Blackhawk Island Rd. Blackhawk Island, Wisconsin
- Built: 1946
- NRHP reference No.: 100002106
- Added to NRHP: February 20, 2018

The Lorine Niedecker Cottage is located in Blackhawk Island, Wisconsin.

== History ==
Lorine Niedecker was a noted poet and a native of Blackhawk Island. She resided in this cottage with her husband and wrote a number of her works in it. It was added to the State Register of Historic Places in 2017 and to the National Register of Historic Places in 2018.
