= Hiram J. Ball =

American politician (1832–1908)

Hiram Jerome Ball (November 9, 1832 – December 16, 1908) was an American politician and farmer.

Born in Hanover, Chautauqua County, New York, Ball moved to Wisconsin Territory in 1846. In 1859, Ball moved to California and then moved back to Jefferson County, Wisconsin in 1862. He was a farmer and lived in Palmyra, Wisconsin. In 1871 and in 1878, Ball served in the Wisconsin State Assembly and was a Democrat. Ball lived in San Jose, California from 1883 until his death in 1908. Ball died from heart failure at his home in San Jose, California.
