= Lorine Niedecker =

American poet (1903–1970)

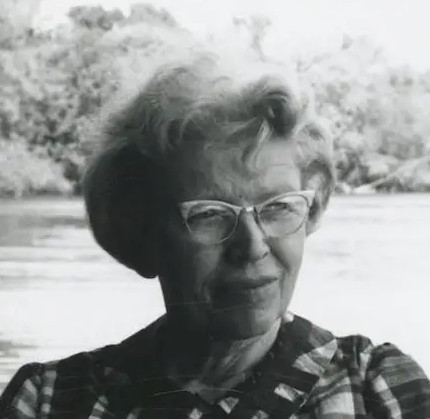
- Born: Lorine Neidecker; May 12, 1903; Blackhawk Island, Wisconsin
- Died: December 31, 1970 (aged 67)
- Education: Beloit College
- Writing career
- Movement: Objectivism

Lorine Faith Niedecker (English: pronounced Needecker; May 12, 1903 – December 31, 1970) was an American poet. Her poetry is known for its spareness, its focus on the natural landscapes of Wisconsin and the Upper Midwest (particularly waterscapes), its philosophical materialism, its mise-en-page experimentation, and its surrealism. She is regarded as a major figure in the history of American regional poetry, the Objectivist poetic movement, and the mid-20th-century American poetic avant-garde.

== Early life ==
Niedecker was born on Black Hawk Island near Fort Atkinson, Wisconsin to Theresa (Daisy) (née Kunz) and Henry Niedecker and lived most of her life in rural isolation. She grew up surrounded by the sights and sounds of the river until she moved to Fort Atkinson to attend school. The environment of birds, trees, water and marsh would inform her later poetry. On graduating from high school in 1922, she went to Beloit College to study literature but left after two years because her father was no longer able to pay her tuition. She devoted herself to caring for her ailing deaf mother, who was deeply depressed by her husband's flagrant affair with a neighbor. Niedecker and Frank Hartwig married in 1928; the relationship lasted two years. Hartwig's fledgling road-construction business foundered during the onset of the Great Depression while Niedecker lost her job at the Fort Atkinson Library. The two separated in 1930 but were not legally divorced until 1942.

== Early writings ==
Niedecker's earliest poetry was marked by her reading of the Imagists and Surrealists. In 1931 she read the Objectivist issue of Poetry. She sent her poems to Louis Zukofsky, who had edited the issue. This was the beginning of what proved to be an important relationship for her development as a poet. Zukofsky suggested sending them to Poetry, where they were accepted for publication. Niedecker then found herself in direct contact with the American poetic avant-garde. Near the end of 1933, Niedecker visited Zukofsky in New York City for the first time and became pregnant with their child. He insisted that she have an abortion, which she did, although they remained friends and continued to carry on a mutually beneficial correspondence following Niedecker's return to Fort Atkinson.

From the mid-1930s, Niedecker moved away from surrealism and started writing poems that engaged more directly with social and political realities and on her own immediate rural surroundings. Her first book, New Goose (1946), collected many of these poems.

== Neglect ==
Niedecker was not to publish another book for fifteen years. In 1949, she began work on a poem sequence called For Paul, named for Zukofsky's son. Unfortunately, Zukofsky was uncomfortable with what he viewed as the overly personal and intrusive nature of the content of the 72 poems she eventually collected under this title and discouraged publication. Partly because of her geographical isolation, even magazine publication was not easily available and in 1955 she claimed that she had published work only six times in the previous ten years.

== Revival ==
The 1960s saw a revival of interest in Niedecker's work. Wild Hawthorn Press and Fulcrum Press, both British-based, published books and magazine publication became regular. She was also befriended by a number of poets, including Cid Corman, Basil Bunting and several younger British and US poets who were interested in reclaiming the modernist heritage. Her books published in the last few decades of her life included My Friend Tree, T & G: The Collected Poems, 1936–1966, North Central, and My Life By Water.

Encouraged by this interest, Niedecker started writing again. She had previously earned her living scrubbing hospital floors in Fort Atkinson, "reading proof" at a local magazine, renting cottages and living in near-poverty for years. However, her marriage in May 1963 to Albert Millen, an industrial painter at Ladish Drop Forge on Milwaukee's south side, brought financial stability back into her life. When Millen retired in 1968, the couple moved back to Blackhawk Island, taking up residence in a small cottage Lorine had built on property she inherited from her father. The cottage, now known as the Lorine Niedecker Cottage, is listed on the National Register of Historic Places.

Niedecker died in 1970 from a cerebral hemorrhage, leaving behind several unpublished typescripts. Many other Niedecker papers were burned by Millen, who said he did so at Niedecker's request. Her name was added to her parents' headstone which uses the original spelling of the family name, Neidecker. Lorine had her name changed to the Niedecker spelling when she was in her twenties. The primary Niedecker archives are in the Dwight Foster Public Library (which inherited Niedecker's personal library) and the Hoard Museum in Fort Atkinson, Wisconsin (which holds a collection of Niedecker's papers, as preserved and donated by her neighbor and close friend, Gail Roub).

Niedecker's comprehensive Collected Works, edited by Jenny Penberthy, were published by the University of California Press in 2002. A centennial celebration of Niedecker's life and work, held in Milwaukee and Fort Atkinson in 2003, included treks to her two Rock River-edged homes on Black Hawk Island and symposium sessions including presentations by scholars and poets. Corman, Niedecker's literary executor who lived most of his creative life in Japan, made his last appearance in the United States during this event.

== Selected bibliography ==
=== Works ===
- New Goose (Prairie City, Ill.: Press of James A. Decker, 1946).
- My Friend Tree (Edinburgh: Wild Hawthorn Press, 1961).
- North Central (London: Fulcrum Press, 1968).
- T&G: The Collected Poems (1936–1966) (Penland, NC: The Jargon Society, 1969).
- My Life by Water: Collected Poems 1936-1968 (London: Fulcrum Press, 1970).
- Blue Chicory (New Rochelle, NY: The Elizabeth Press, 1976).
- The Granite Pail: Selected Poems of Lorine Niedecker, ed. Cid Corman (San Francisco: North Point Press, 1985).
- From This Condensery: The Complete Writing of Lorine Niedecker, ed. Robert J. Bertholf (Highlands, NC: Jargon Society, 1985).
- Harpsichord & Salt Fish (Durham: Pig Press, 1991).
- Collected Works, ed. Jenny Penberthy (Berkeley: University of California Press, 2002). ISBN 0-520-22433-7
- Lake Superior (Seattle & New York: Wave Books, 2013). This edition of the poem includes sources materials and commentary.

=== Correspondence ===
- "Between Your House and Mine": The Letters of Lorine Niedecker to Cid Corman, 1960-1970, ed. Lisa Pater Faranda (Duke University Press, 1987)
- Niedecker and the Correspondence with Zukofsky, 1931-1970, ed. Jenny Penberthy (Cambridge University Press, 1993)
