= Ludwig Kumlien =

American ornithologist (1853–1902)

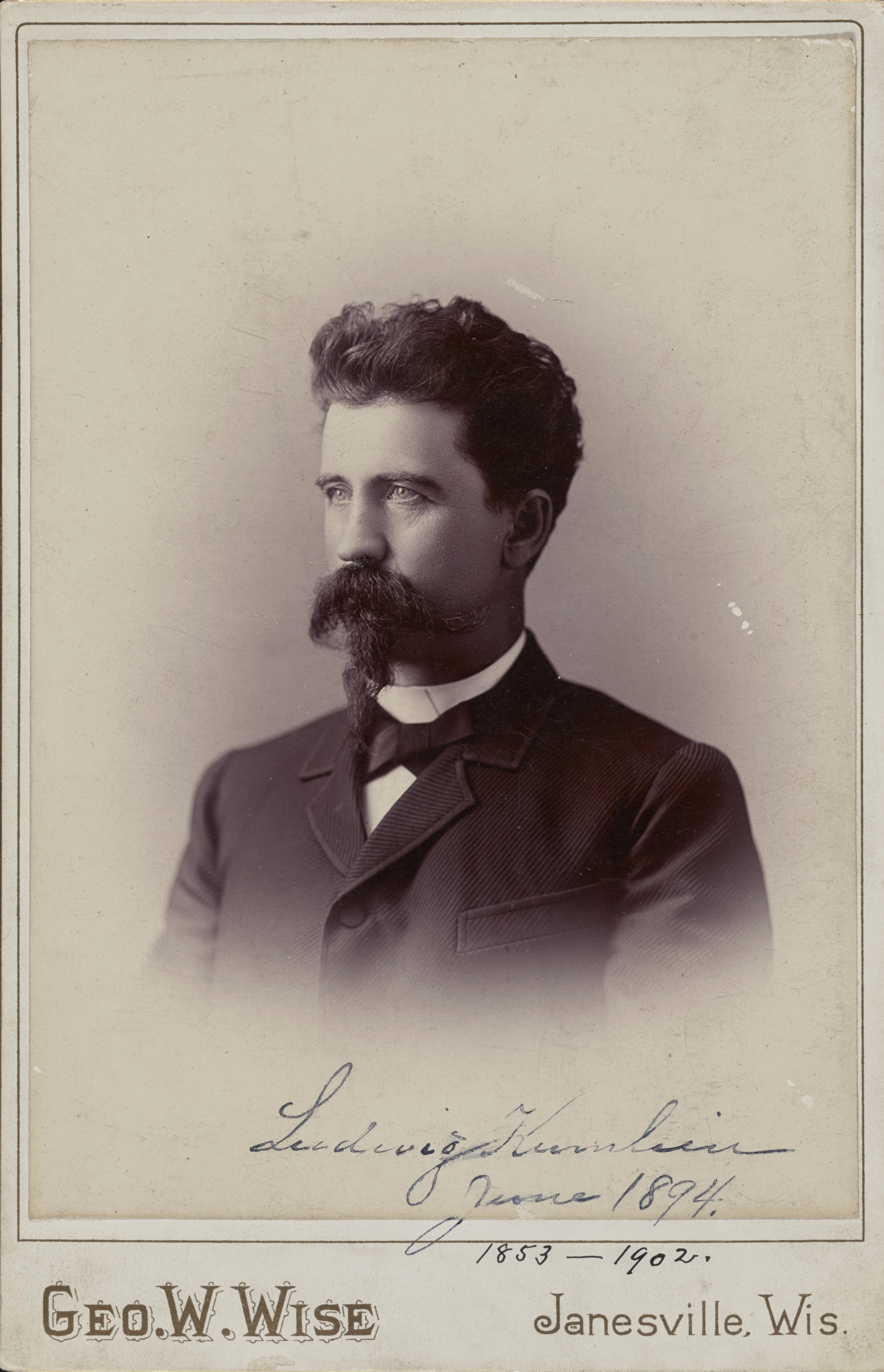
Carte-de-visite portrait, 1894

Aaron Ludwig Kumlien (March 15, 1853 – December 4, 1902) was an American ornithologist and the oldest son of Thure Kumlien. He took part in the Howgate Polar Expedition 1877-78 and collected a large number of bird specimens which led to the discovery of several new species including what is now known as Kumlien's gull (Larus [glaucoides] kumlieni).

Kumlien was born in a log cabin in Busseyville, Jefferson County to the Swedish-born naturalist Thure Kumlien and his wife Christina Wallberg. Ludwig went to school followed by Albion Academy in Dane County, Wisconsin, where his father was a professor of zoology and botany. Graduating in 1873, he joined the University of Wisconsin for a while and obtained a master of science from Milton College in 1892. He joined the Howgate Polar Expedition as a naturalist in 1877-78. Among the bird specimens was a gull that William Brewster described as a new species named as Larus kumlieni (Kumlien's gull). The expedition was funded by whaling operations conducted during the journey. He later became a professor of physics and natural history at Milton College in 1894 where he influenced many students. He died from throat cancer at his home in Milton, Wisconsin, and was buried in Milton Cemetery.

During the Howgate Polar Expedition, Kumlien kept careful record of the names used by Inuit for the birds. This was re-examined in 1961 by Laurence Irving, who found the names to be stable and in use across a large area.
