= Myron B. Williams =

American politician (1817–1884)

The Honorable Myron B. Williams

Indiana Superior Court Judge for Marion County
- In office March 1877 – January 3, 1881
- Appointed by: James D. Williams
- Succeeded by: L. C. Walker

District Attorney of Jefferson County, Wisconsin
- In office January 4, 1869 – January 6, 1873
- Preceded by: D. F. Weymouth
- Succeeded by: N. Steinaker
- In office January 5, 1863 – January 7, 1867
- Preceded by: Hiram Barber Jr.
- Succeeded by: D. F. Weymouth

6th Mayor of Watertown, Wisconsin
- In office April 1860 – April 1862
- Preceded by: Calvin B. Skinner
- Succeeded by: William M. Dennis

Member of the Wisconsin Senate from the 12th district
- In office June 5, 1848 – January 7, 1850
- Preceded by: Position established
- Succeeded by: Peter H. Turner

Personal details
- Born: 1816 or 1817
- Died: December 7, 1884 (aged 67) Indianapolis, Indiana, U.S.
- Resting place: Crown Hill Cemetery and Arboretum, Section 25, Lot 247, Indianapolis, Indiana
- Party: Democratic

Myron B. Williams (c. 1817 – December 7, 1884) was an American lawyer, Democratic politician, and Wisconsin pioneer. He was important in the establishment and early development of Watertown, Wisconsin, and represented Jefferson County in the Wisconsin State Senate during the 1st and 2nd legislatures (1848, 1849).

== Biography ==
Myron Williams settled at Watertown, Wisconsin, sometime in the 1840s, and was described as the second practicing lawyer in the village. In 1848, in the first election for state officers after Wisconsin was admitted to the Union, Williams was elected to represent Jefferson County in the Wisconsin State Senate. Over the next 30 years, he would serve as a county supervisor, city councilmember, school board member, postmaster, mayor, and district attorney in Jefferson County.

He moved to Indiana in the mid-1870s, where Governor James D. Williams appointed him Judge of the Marion County Superior Court in 1877, when an additional court was instituted by the legislature. Williams served as the 1882 President of the Indianapolis Bar Association. He died in Indianapolis, Indiana, at the age of 67, from inflammation of the bowels following a brief illness.

Wisconsin Senate
State government established	Member of the Wisconsin Senate from the 12th district June 5, 1848 – January 7, 1850	Succeeded by Peter H. Turner
Political offices
Preceded by Calvin B. Skinner	Mayor of Watertown, Wisconsin; April 1860 – April 1862	Succeeded by William M. Dennis
Legal offices
Preceded by Hiram Barber Jr.	District Attorney of Jefferson County, Wisconsin; January 5, 1863 – January 7, 1867	Succeeded by D. F. Weymouth
Preceded by D. F. Weymouth	District Attorney of Jefferson County, Wisconsin; January 4, 1869 – January 6, 1873	Succeeded by N. Steinaker
