= Henry C. Christians =

American businessman and politician

Henry C. Christians (June 16, 1862 – February 27, 1945) was an American businessman and politician.

Born in the town of Aztalan, Jefferson County, Wisconsin, Christians owned a creamery and an egg and butter cold storage business in Johnson Creek, Wisconsin. He also served as president of the Farmers and Merchants Bank of Jefferson. Christians served as the Aztalan town clerk and postmaster of Johnson Creek. Christians was a Democrat. In 1895, Christians served in the Wisconsin State Assembly. Christians retired in 1942 and moved to Los Angeles, California. He died at his home in Los Angeles, California.
