= Peter H. Turner =

19th century American politician, Wisconsin State Senate

Member of the Wisconsin Senate from the 12th district
- In office January 1, 1850 – January 1, 1852
- Preceded by: Myron B. Williams
- Succeeded by: Alva Stewart

Member of the Wisconsin State Assembly from the Jefferson 2nd district
- In office June 5, 1848 – January 1, 1849
- Preceded by: Position established
- Succeeded by: Jarvis K. Pike

Personal details
- Born: April 11, 1813 Ilion, New York
- Died: June 4, 1885 (aged 72) Sioux City, Iowa
- Resting place: Floyd Cemetery; Sioux City, Iowa
- Party: Democratic

Peter Helmer Turner (April 11, 1813 – June 4, 1885) was an American pioneer and politician.

== Biography ==
Born in Ilion, New York, Turner was in the merchandise business and was in the milling business while living in Ellisburg, New York. In 1840, he moved to Genesee, Milwaukee County, Wisconsin Territory, and then to the town of Palmyra, in Jefferson County. He was elected to the first Wisconsin Constitutional Convention of 1846 serving as a Democrat. Turner then served in the Wisconsin State Assembly in 1848 and in the Wisconsin State Senate in 1850. In 1859, Turner moved to Madison, Wisconsin, where he served on the Madison Common Council and served as president. Turner moved to Dakota Territory in 1871 settling in the Vermillion Valley. He then moved to Sioux City, Iowa, where he died in 1885.

== Relatives ==
There are unsourced assertions on some websites that he was the brother of Joseph Turner (Wisconsin politician), who also came to Wisconsin Territory in 1840.

Wisconsin State Assembly
New state government	Member of the Wisconsin State Assembly from the Jefferson 2nd district 1848 – 1849	Succeeded by Jarvis K. Pike
Wisconsin Senate
Preceded by Myron B. Williams	Member of the Wisconsin Senate from the 12th district 1850 – 1852	Succeeded by Alva Stewart
