= Thure Kumlien =

Swedish-American ornithologist, naturalist and taxidermist

Thure Ludwig Theodor Kumlien
- Born: November 9, 1819; Härlunda, Västergötland, Sweden
- Died: August 5, 1888 (aged 68); Milwaukee, Wisconsin, United States
- Occupations: Farmer, Ornithologist, Naturalist, Taxidermist

Thure Ludwig Theodor Kumlien (November 9, 1819 – August 5, 1888) was a Swedish-American ornithologist, naturalist, and taxidermist. A contemporary of Thoreau, Audubon, and Agassiz, he contributed much to the knowledge of the natural history of Wisconsin and its birds. He collected and shipped specimens to many investigators in the United States and abroad. He taught botany and zoology, as well as foreign languages, at Albion Academy, and was particularly regarded as an expert in the identification of birds’ nests.

== Family and early life ==
Thure Kumlien was born in 1819 in the parish of Härlunda in Västergötland, Sweden, the oldest of fourteen children in an aristocratic Swedish family. His father, Ludwig Kumlien (1790–1839), was an army quartermaster, and owned several large estates. His mother, Johanna Rhodin (1800–1830) was the daughter of a minister. His early education was with a tutor, after which he entered the Gymnasium of Skara. He subsequently attended Uppsala University, graduating in 1843. He took an early interest in natural history and collected many specimens, particularly from the Baltic islands, sending them to Hermann Schlegel of Leiden; Wilhelm Peters of Berlin, Carl Jakob Sundevall of the Swedish Museum of Natural History, Stockholm, and John Cassin of Boston were among his other correspondents.

It was also during his university years that Kumlien met Margretta Christine Wallberg, described as “the most beautiful girl of all this nation of handsome women.” Despite opposition from the King, the Church, and Thure’s father due to differences in social standing (Margretta was the daughter of a minor officer in the Swedish Army responsible for the King’s cavalry horses), the couple became engaged.

In 1843, seeking new opportunities and perhaps to overcome familial objections, Thure and Margretta emigrated to the United States, accompanied by Margretta’s older sister, Sophia. They endured a challenging ten-week voyage aboard the leaky ship Swea Maria, arriving in New York on August 20, 1843. Shortly after, they settled in Milwaukee, Wisconsin, where Thure and Margretta married on September 5, 1843.

== Career ==
Kumlien in 1875, while at the University of Wisconsin

Kumlien emigrated to the United States in 1843, accompanied by his fiancée, Margaretta Christina Wallberg, and her sister. They first settled in Milwaukee and were married there on September 5 of the same year. Not long afterward, drawn by letters written by the minister of a local parish, he came to the Lake Koshkonong area of Wisconsin. When he bought his homestead, he bypassed farmland and instead purchased woodland, probably because of his love of nature, and devoted his spare time to the study of surrounding nature, in particular the local plants, birds, and insects. His first purchase was 40 acres (16 ha), from the government; he bought another 40 acres later. His first home was a log house near Busseyville. Often distracted by local wildlife and plants, Kumlien did not succeed at farming; he supplemented his farm income with taxidermy and by collecting specimens for museums and other scientists.

Kumlien's life work constituted a rich personal herbarium and an important collection of birds. He began with a collection acquired by the Boston Society of Natural Sciences in 1854, and expanded his reach to Europe, sending specimens to such scientists as Elias Magnus Fries of Uppsala and Thomas Mayo Brewer. He also kept up correspondence with Spencer Fullerton Baird, Edward Augustus Samuels, and others. Kumlien was described by no less a luminary than Louis Agassiz as the world's foremost authority on the identification of birds' nests. Combined with his modesty, his collecting and correspondence made him more widely known to fellow scientists than to his neighbors. In spite of the recognition and the regard he received from the scientific community, he lived in tight financial circumstances nearly all of his life.

Through the efforts of Rasmus Bjørn Anderson, Kumlien accepted a position in the faculty of Albion Academy, in Albion, Wisconsin. From 1867 to 1870, he taught not only botany and zoology, but also foreign languages; he left when financial turmoil hit the college. He took a position with the State of Wisconsin in 1870, collecting specimens for the University of Wisconsin in Madison and the teacher training school (the university's collections were destroyed in a fire in 1884). From 1881 to 1883, he worked for the Wisconsin Natural History Society as taxidermist and conservator of its collections. He edited the exsiccata-like series Plantae Visconsinenses.

In 1883, the Natural History Society's collections were transferred to the Milwaukee Public Museum, and Kumlien began working for the museum in the same capacity, which enabled him to pursue his naturalist studies year round. He became a member of the American Ornithologists' Union the year it was founded (1883). He died in 1888, most likely as a result of exposure to preservatives used on bird specimens sent from South America. He is buried at Sweet Cemetery, in Albion. His work can still be viewed at numerous museums in Europe and America.

== Legacy ==
Thure and Margaretta Kumlien had five children (three sons and two daughters): Agusta Kumlien (1844–1845), Aaron Ludwig Kumlien (1853–1902), Theodore Victor Kumlien (1855–1941), Swea Maria Kumlien (1857), and Frithiof Kumlien (1859–1888). Agusta and Frithiof are buried with their parents.

Kumlien trained his son, Ludwig Kumlien, an ornithologist, and also Edward Lee Greene, a botanist.

Kumlien was also acquainted with Willard North, the father of author Sterling North; the younger North included him in such books as Rascal and The Wolfling.

A number of species have been named for Kumlien:

- Aster Kumlienii Benke, a purple aster that grows at Busseyville.
- Cottus bairdii kumlienii (Hoy), the northern mottled sculpin.
- Kumlienia is a genus of flowering plants in the buttercup family. It was named for Kumlien by his student Greene.

== Bibliography ==
- Bergland, M. (2021). The Birdman of Koshkonong: The Life of Naturalist Thure Kumlien. Wisconsin Historical Society Press.
- H.J. Taylor (June 1936). "Thure Kumlien" (PDF). The Wilson Bulletin. 48 (2): 86–93.
