= Cold Spring, Wisconsin =

Town of Cold Spring, Wisconsin
- Town
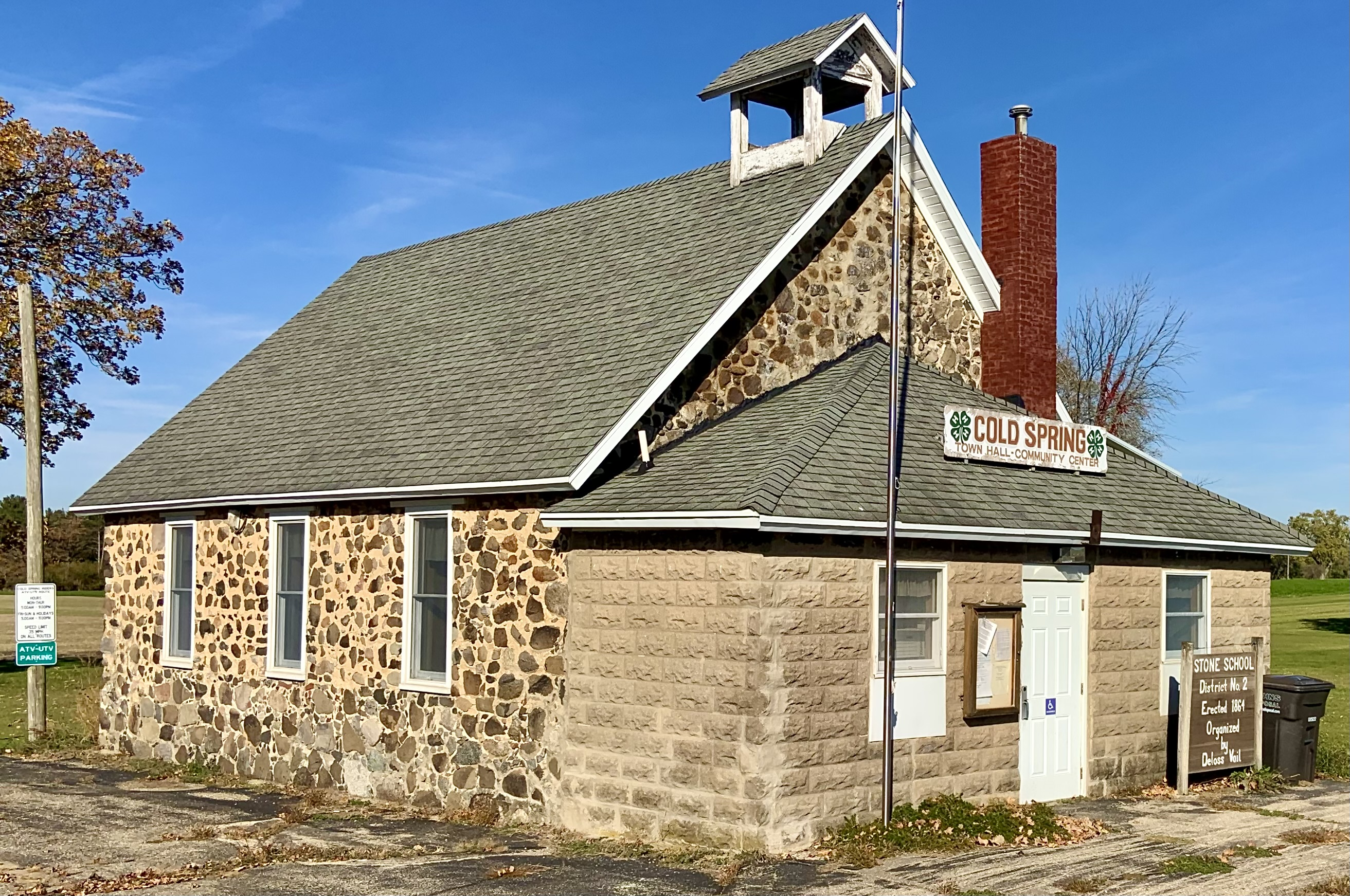
- Town hall

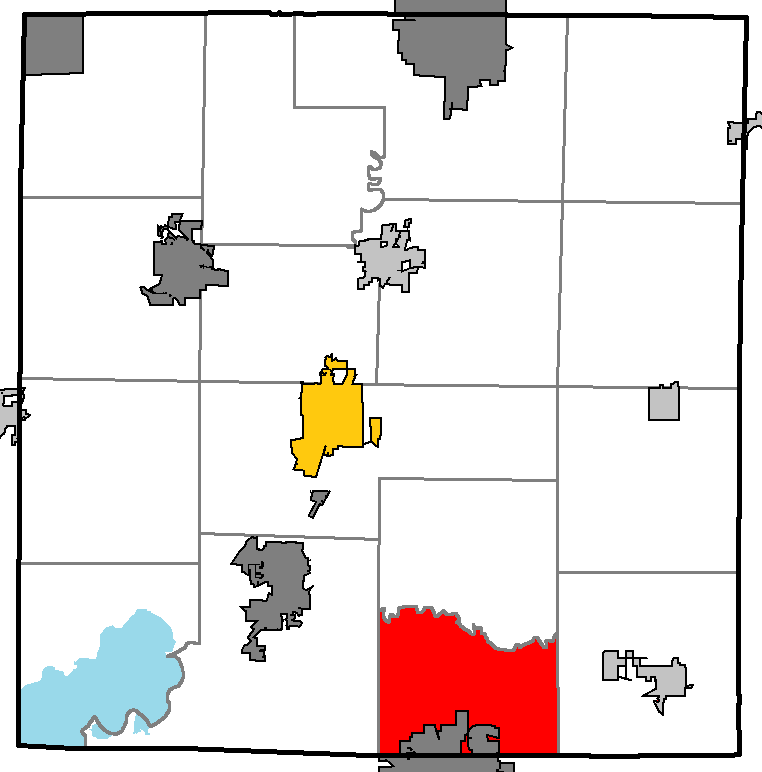
- Location of Cold Spring, within Jefferson County

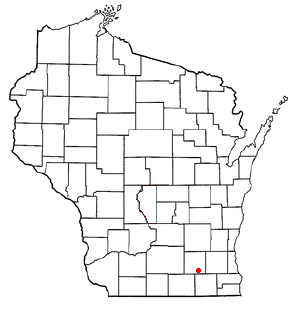
- Location of the Town of Cold Spring, Wisconsin
- Coordinates: 42°51′49″N 88°43′44″W
- Country: United States
- State: Wisconsin
- County: Jefferson

Area
  - Total: 22.7 sq mi (58.7 km^{2})
  - Land: 22.6 sq mi (58.6 km^{2})
  - Water: 0.039 sq mi (0.1 km^{2})
- Elevation: 801 ft (244 m)

Population (2020)
  - Total: 737
  - Density: 32.6/sq mi (12.6/km^{2})
- Time zone: UTC-6 (Central (CST))
  - Summer (DST): UTC-5 (CDT)
- FIPS code: 55-16225
- GNIS feature ID: 1582999
- Website: https://townofcoldspringwi.com/

Cold Spring is a town in Jefferson County, Wisconsin, United States. The population was 737 as of the 2020 census.

== Geography ==
According to the United States Census Bureau, the town has a total area of 22.7 square miles (58.7 km^{2}), of which 22.6 square miles (58.6 km^{2}) is land and 0.04 square miles (0.1 km^{2}), or 0.24%, is water.

== Demographics ==
As of the 2020 census, there were 737 people, 302 households, and 317 families residing in the town. The racial makeup of the town was 88.87% White, 0.27% African American, 0.41% Native American, 0.68% Asian, 2.58% from other races, and 6.92% from two or more races. Hispanic or Latino of any race were 5.69% of the population.

As of the census of 2000 the population density was 32.7 people per square mile (12.6/km^{2}). There were 278 housing units at an average density of 11.9 per square mile (4.6/km^{2}). There were 269 households, out of which 34.9% had children under the age of 18 living with them, 74.0% were married couples living together, 5.9% had a female householder with no husband present, and 17.1% were non-families. 13.4% of all households were made up of individuals, and 5.2% had someone living alone who was 65 years of age or older. The average household size was 2.79 and the average family size was 3.03.

In the town, the population was spread out, with 25.1% under the age of 18, 6.0% from 18 to 24, 29.6% from 25 to 44, 29.4% from 45 to 64, and 9.9% who were 65 years of age or older. The median age was 39 years. For every 100 females, there were 108.2 males. For every 100 females age 18 and over, there were 111.0 males.

The median income for a household in the town was $60,789, and the median income for a family was $61,917. Males had a median income of $40,250 versus $26,016 for females. The per capita income for the town was $22,335. About 1.9% of families and 3.8% of the population were below the poverty line, including 1.6% of those under age 18 and 5.1% of those age 65 or over.

== Notable people ==
- Edward S. Curtis (1868-1952), photographer whose work focused on Native Americans and the American West was born in Cold Spring.
- Nelson Fryer, farmer and politician, lived in Cold Spring; he served in the Wisconsin Assembly and as chairman of the town board
- George Wilbur Peck (1840–1916), author, 29th Mayor of Milwaukee and 17th governor of Wisconsin, moved to Cold Spring with his family in 1843; he left to enlist in the Union Army in 1863
- Jarvis K. Pike, state legislator and judge. Pike also served as a justice of the peace in Cold Spring
