= Sylvester J. Conklin =

American politician

Sylvester Jones Conklin (5 May 1829 – 20 May 1914) was a member of the Wisconsin State Assembly.

== Biography ==
Conklin was born Penn Yan, New York or Greenwood, New York. In 1848, he married Maria Wait. They had three children. Conklin later remarried twice. First, to Mattie Greenslate in 1884, and second, to Anna Duff in 1895. During the American Civil War, Conkin served with the 48th Wisconsin Volunteer Infantry Regiment. From 1901 to 1903, he was Adjutant General of South Dakota. Conklin went to the old soldiers home at Hot Springs, South Dakota and appeared to have died in a hospital in Pierre, South Dakota after scolding himself in a bath.

== Political career ==
Conklin was a member of the Assembly in 1859 and 1869. He was a Republican.
