= William Everson (Wisconsin politician) =

American politician (1841–1928)

William Everson (June 20, 1841 – January 28, 1928) was an American farmer and politician.

Born in the town of Aztalan, Jefferson County, Wisconsin Territory, Everson moved with his parents to the town of Lake Mills, Wisconsin. Everson was a farmer and cattle dealer. Everson was the Lake Mills town assessor and town board chairman. When Everson moved to the city of Lake Mills, Wisconsin, he also served on the Lake Mills common council. In 1917, Everson served in the Wisconsin State Assembly and was a Democrat. Everson died at his home in Lake Mills, Wisconsin.
