= Oscar F. Roessler =

American politician

Oscar F. Roessler (January 29, 1860 – June 6, 1932) was an American newspaper editor and politician.

Born in Jefferson, Wisconsin, Roessler went to Jefferson High School and Jefferson Liberal Institute. He lived in Jefferson, Wisconsin all of his life except for two years living in Greeley, Colorado, one year in Kilbourn City, Wisconsin, and one year in Juneau, Wisconsin. Roessler was a printer and editor of the Jefferson Banner newspaper in Jefferson, Wisconsin. Roessler was involved with the Jefferson County Fair and the Wisconsin Fireman's Association. He was also a member of the Wisconsin State Board of Agriculture. Rossler served on the Jefferson Common Council. He served on the Jefferson County Board of Supervisors and was chairman of the county board. In 1911 and 1913, Roessler served in the Wisconsin State Assembly and was active in the Democratic Party. Roessler died in Jefferson, Wisconsin.
