= Johnson Creek, Wisconsin =

- Village
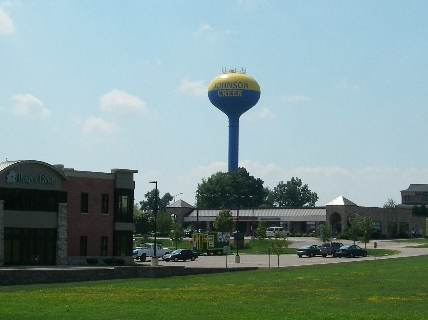

- Location of Johnson Creek in Jefferson County, Wisconsin.
- Coordinates: 43°4′45″N 88°46′16″W
- Country: United States
- State: Wisconsin
- County: Jefferson

Government
  - Type: Village Board (President - Trustees)
  - President: John Swisher

Area
  - Total: 3.04 sq mi (7.88 km^{2})
  - Land: 3.03 sq mi (7.85 km^{2})
  - Water: 0.012 sq mi (0.03 km^{2})
- Elevation: 830 ft (250 m)

Population (2020)
  - Total: 3,318
  - Density: 1,005.3/sq mi (388.14/km^{2})
- Time zone: UTC-6 (Central (CST))
  - Summer (DST): UTC-5 (CDT)
- Area code: 920
- FIPS code: 55-38350
- GNIS feature ID: 1567212
- Website: vi.johnsoncreek.wi.gov

Johnson Creek is a village in Jefferson County, Wisconsin, United States. The population was 3,318 at the 2020 census. The village is approximately halfway between Milwaukee and Madison, at the intersection of Wisconsin Highway 26 and Interstate 94.

== History ==
The first two settlers were Charles Goodhue and Timothy Johnson, the latter of whom also founded nearby Watertown. The creek was named for Timothy Johnson, the first settler on the creek. The station was first called Belleville up until 1872, this caused it to be confused with another Belleville, Wisconsin. The post office has always been named Johnson Creek and in 1872 it was found that priority of settlement should be given to Mr. Johnson, and hence the name was changed to honor him. Johnson Creek.

Johnson Creek was founded where the Union Pacific railroad crosses Johnson Creek just above where the stream empties into the Rock River. The Union Pacific spur currently runs from Fort Atkinson to Clyman Junction. The economy is now more dependent on Interstate 94. A large outlet mall shopping complex was built in 1998 to capitalize on this traffic. The once famous hotel and supper club, The Gobbler, was in Johnson Creek.

== Geography ==
According to the United States Census Bureau, the village has a total area of 3.03 square miles (7.85 km^{2}), of which 3.02 square miles (7.82 km^{2}) is land and 0.01 square miles (0.03 km^{2}) is water.

== Demographics ==
Historical population
Census	Pop.	Note	%±
1880	208		—
1890	176		−15.4%
1910	425		—
1920	493		16.0%
1930	457		−7.3%
1940	511		11.8%
1950	575		12.5%
1960	686		19.3%
1970	790		15.2%
1980	1,136		43.8%
1990	1,259		10.8%
2000	1,581		25.6%
2010	2,738		73.2%
2020	3,318		21.2%
U.S. Decennial Census

=== 2010 census ===
As of the census of 2010, there were 2,738 people, 1,049 households, and 736 families living in the village. The population density was 906.6 inhabitants per square mile (350.0/km^{2}). There were 1,118 housing units at an average density of 370.2 per square mile (142.9/km^{2}). The racial makeup of the village was 93.2% White, 0.9% African American, 0.3% Native American, 1.2% Asian, 2.8% from other races, and 1.5% from two or more races. Hispanic or Latino of any race were 7.5% of the population.

There were 1,049 households, of which 36.5% had children under the age of 18 living with them, 58.5% were married couples living together, 7.4% had a female householder with no husband present, 4.2% had a male householder with no wife present, and 29.8% were non-families. 21.7% of all households were made up of individuals, and 5.2% had someone living alone who was 65 years of age or older. The average household size was 2.60 and the average family size was 3.06.

The median age in the village was 32.4 years. 27% of residents were under the age of 18; 7% were between the ages of 18 and 24; 35.5% were from 25 to 44; 22% were from 45 to 64; and 8.4% were 65 years of age or older. The gender makeup of the village was 48.8% male and 51.2% female.

=== 2000 census ===
As of the census of 2000, there were 1,581 people, 624 households, and 423 families living in the village. The population density was 735.2 people per square mile (283.9/km^{2}). There were 659 housing units at an average density of 306.4 per square mile (118.3/km^{2}). The racial makeup of the village was 95.19% White, 0.19% African American, 0.82% Native American, 0.25% Asian, 2.21% from other races, and 1.33% from two or more races. Hispanic or Latino of any race were 3.98% of the population.

There were 624 households, out of which 35.4% had children under the age of 18 living with them, 52.7% were married couples living together, 9.5% had a female householder with no husband present, and 32.2% were non-families. 23.7% of all households were made up of individuals, and 9.8% had someone living alone who was 65 years of age or older. The average household size was 2.53 and the average family size was 3.01.

In the village, the population was spread out, with 26.6% under the age of 18, 9.8% from 18 to 24, 34.7% from 25 to 44, 19.4% from 45 to 64, and 9.5% who were 65 years of age or older. The median age was 32 years. For every 100 females, there were 97.9 males. For every 100 females age 18 and over, there were 97.3 males.

The median income for a household in the village was $45,694, and the median income for a family was $49,348. Males had a median income of $35,540 versus $25,927 for females. The per capita income for the village was $19,671. About 3.0% of families and 4.3% of the population were below the poverty line, including 4.3% of those under age 18 and 8.7% of those age 65 or over.

== Education ==
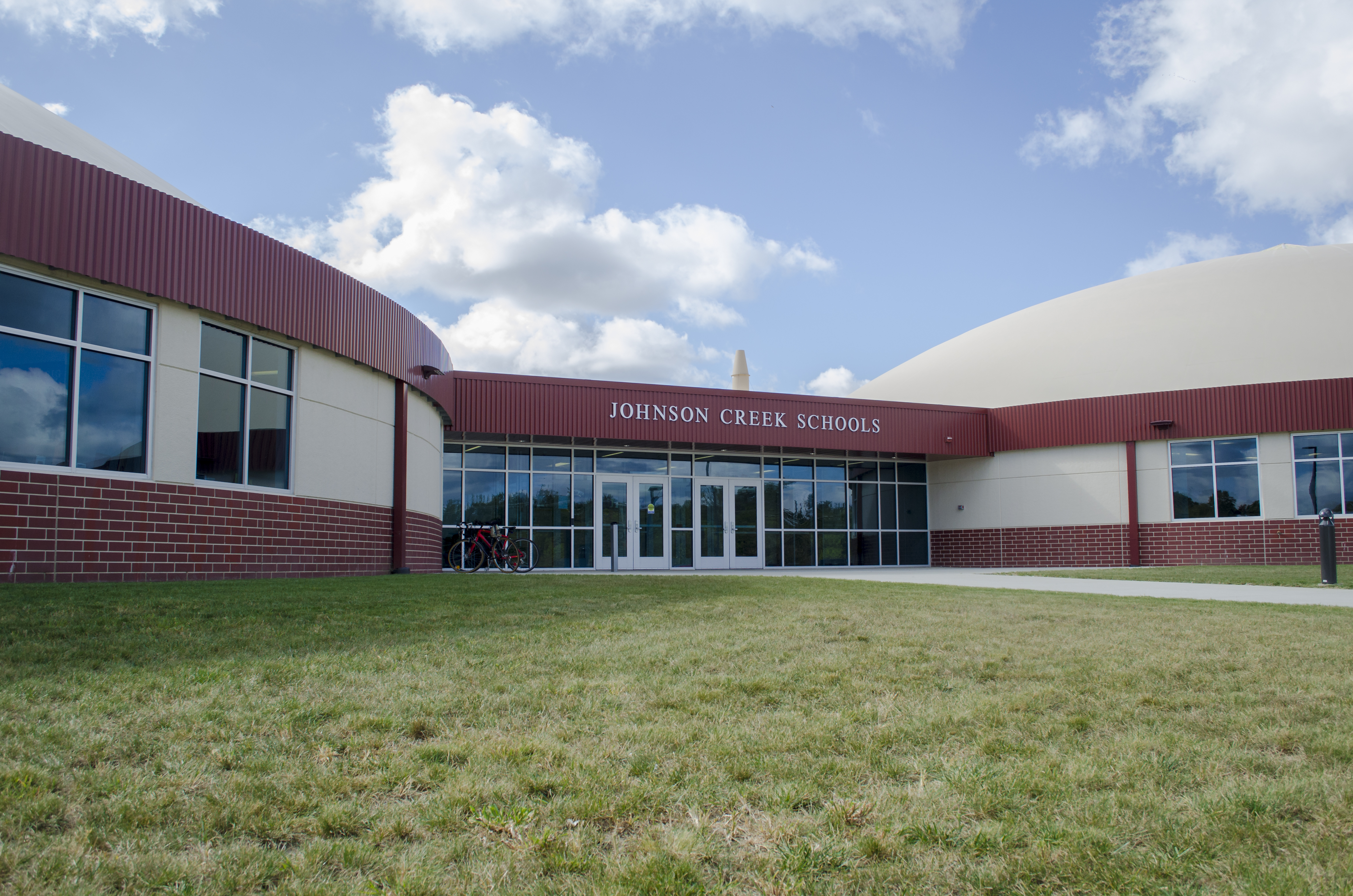
Johnson Creek Middle/High School

The Johnson Creek School District operates a 68-acre 4K to 12 campus on the western side of the village. It serves about 750 students. Johnson Creek High School won the 2007 Wisconsin State Baseball Championship in WIAA Division 4. The baseball team was WIAA Division 4 State Runner's Up in 2012.

In 2014, voters passed a $22M referendum to begin construction of a new school to be constructed from five modular domes for grades 5-12.

In 2020, voters passed a $15M referendum to begin construction of three additional modular domes for grades 4K-4 to be added to the existing 5-12 grade campus.

== Notable people ==
- Henry C. Christians, Wisconsin State Representative and businessman, was the postmaster of Johnson Creek.
- H. J. Grell, Wisconsin State Representative and businessman, was born in and served as President and a member of the school board of Johnson Creek.
