= Lake Mills, Wisconsin =

- City
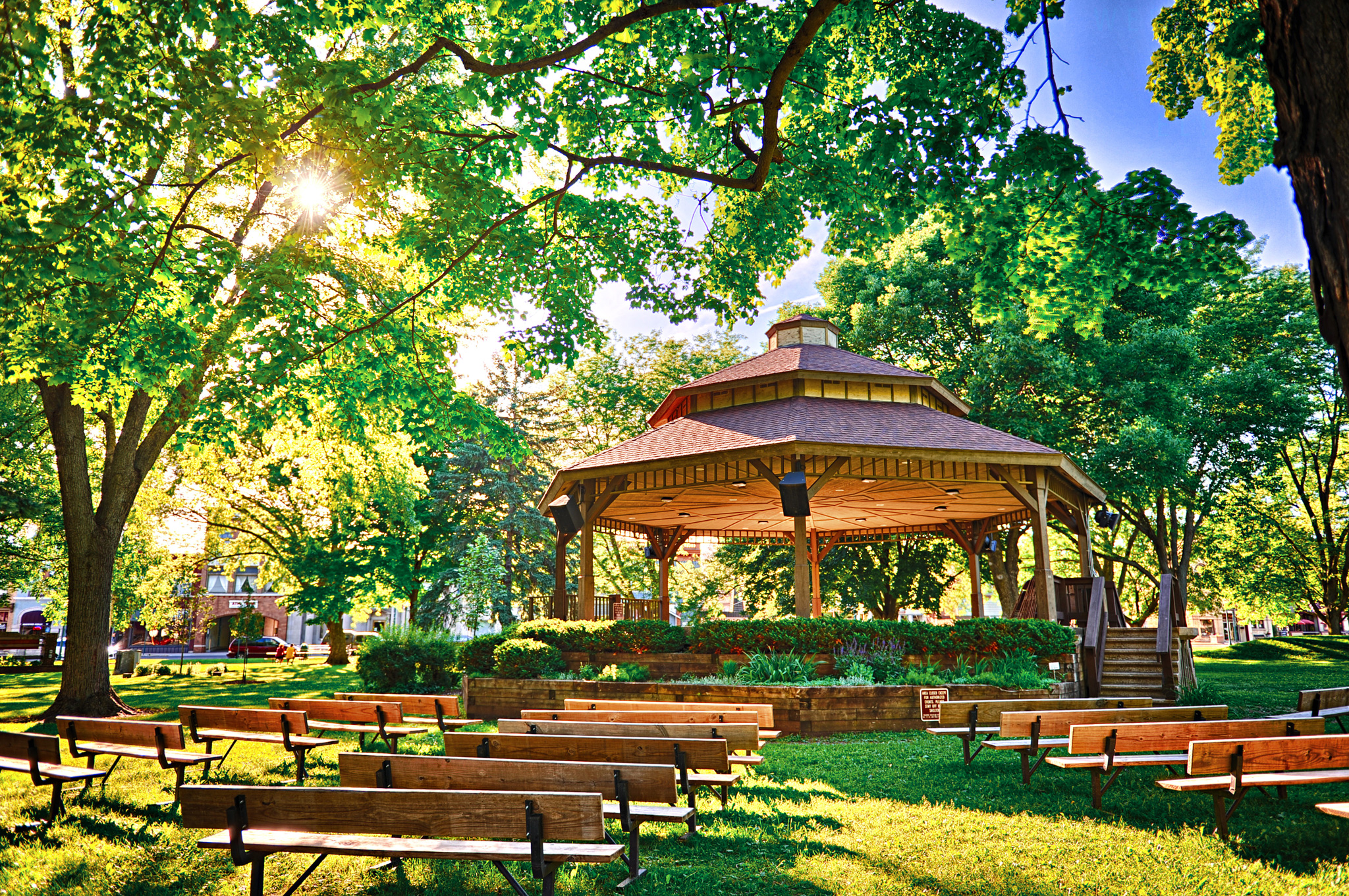
- Franklin Else Bandstand in Commons Park

- Location of Lake Mills in Jefferson County, Wisconsin.

- Location within Wisconsin Location within the United States
- Coordinates: 43°4′48″N 88°54′33″W
- Country: United States
- State: Wisconsin
- County: Jefferson

Government
  - Type: City Council

Area
  - Total: 4.48 sq mi (11.61 km^{2})
  - Land: 4.17 sq mi (10.81 km^{2})
  - Water: 0.31 sq mi (0.80 km^{2})
- Elevation: 837 ft (255 m)

Population (2020)
  - Total: 6,211
  - Density: 1,434.1/sq mi (553.69/km^{2})
- Time zone: UTC-6 (Central (CST))
  - Summer (DST): UTC-5 (CDT)
- Zip Code: 53551
- Area code: 920
- FIPS code: 55-41675
- GNIS feature ID: 1567742
- Website: cityoflakemillswi.gov

Lake Mills is a city in Jefferson County, Wisconsin, United States. The population was 6,211 at the 2020 census. The city is located partially within the Town of Lake Mills.

== History ==
Lake Mills occupies the east shore of Rock Lake. The area was first settled by Captain Joseph Keyes. He called it "Lake Mills", after building a saw mill and grist mill using power from nearby Rock Lake.

Lake Mills was chartered in 1836, and the first building was built in 1837. The village of Lake Mills incorporated in 1852 out of the surrounding town of Lake Mills. In 1866 the village changed its name to "Tyranena", but changed it back again to "Lake Mills" the next year. (Tyranena is supposedly an indigenous name meaning "sparkling waters".)

== Geography ==
Lake Mills is located at 43°4′48″N 88°54′33″W (43.080108, -88.909209).

According to the United States Census Bureau, the city has a total area of 4.44 square miles (11.50 km^{2}), of which 4.06 square miles (10.52 km^{2}) is land and 0.38 square miles (0.98 km^{2}) is water.

=== Climate ===
Climate data for Lake Mills Wastewater Treatment Plant, Wisconsin (1991–2020 normals, extremes 1893–present)
Month	Jan	Feb	Mar	Apr	May	Jun	Jul	Aug	Sep	Oct	Nov	Dec	Year
Record high °F (°C)	60 (16)	71 (22)	84 (29)	89 (32)	103 (39)	104 (40)	110 (43)	104 (40)	100 (38)	90 (32)	77 (25)	66 (19)	110 (43)
Mean daily maximum °F (°C)	26.8 (−2.9)	31.1 (−0.5)	43.2 (6.2)	57.0 (13.9)	69.5 (20.8)	79.8 (26.6)	83.5 (28.6)	81.0 (27.2)	74.0 (23.3)	60.8 (16.0)	45.2 (7.3)	32.3 (0.2)	57.0 (13.9)
Daily mean °F (°C)	19.1 (−7.2)	22.6 (−5.2)	33.9 (1.1)	46.4 (8.0)	58.6 (14.8)	69.1 (20.6)	73.0 (22.8)	70.8 (21.6)	62.9 (17.2)	50.5 (10.3)	36.9 (2.7)	25.1 (−3.8)	47.4 (8.6)
Mean daily minimum °F (°C)	11.4 (−11.4)	14.1 (−9.9)	24.6 (−4.1)	35.9 (2.2)	47.7 (8.7)	58.4 (14.7)	62.4 (16.9)	60.6 (15.9)	51.7 (10.9)	40.2 (4.6)	28.5 (−1.9)	18.0 (−7.8)	37.8 (3.2)
Record low °F (°C)	−33 (−36)	−32 (−36)	−18 (−28)	8 (−13)	20 (−7)	29 (−2)	40 (4)	34 (1)	24 (−4)	−3 (−19)	−13 (−25)	−24 (−31)	−33 (−36)
Average precipitation inches (mm)	1.41 (36)	1.52 (39)	2.03 (52)	3.59 (91)	4.39 (112)	5.11 (130)	4.37 (111)	4.50 (114)	3.47 (88)	2.82 (72)	2.12 (54)	1.65 (42)	36.98 (939)
Average snowfall inches (cm)	10.7 (27)	11.4 (29)	4.9 (12)	2.1 (5.3)	0.1 (0.25)	0.0 (0.0)	0.0 (0.0)	0.0 (0.0)	0.0 (0.0)	0.2 (0.51)	2.0 (5.1)	10.9 (28)	42.3 (107)
Average precipitation days (≥ 0.01 in)	8.4	6.9	7.3	10.3	11.5	11.6	9.2	9.1	8.6	10.0	8.3	8.5	109.7
Average snowy days (≥ 0.1 in)	6.3	5.8	3.1	0.8	0.0	0.0	0.0	0.0	0.0	0.1	1.8	5.9	23.8
Source: NOAA

== Demographics ==
Historical population
Census	Pop.	Note	%±
1870	590		—
1880	671		13.7%
1890	1,053		56.9%
1900	1,387		31.7%
1910	1,672		20.5%
1920	1,754		4.9%
1930	2,007		14.4%
1940	2,219		10.6%
1950	2,516		13.4%
1960	2,951		17.3%
1970	3,556		20.5%
1980	3,670		3.2%
1990	4,143		12.9%
2000	4,843		16.9%
2010	5,708		17.9%
2020	6,211		8.8%
U.S. Decennial Census

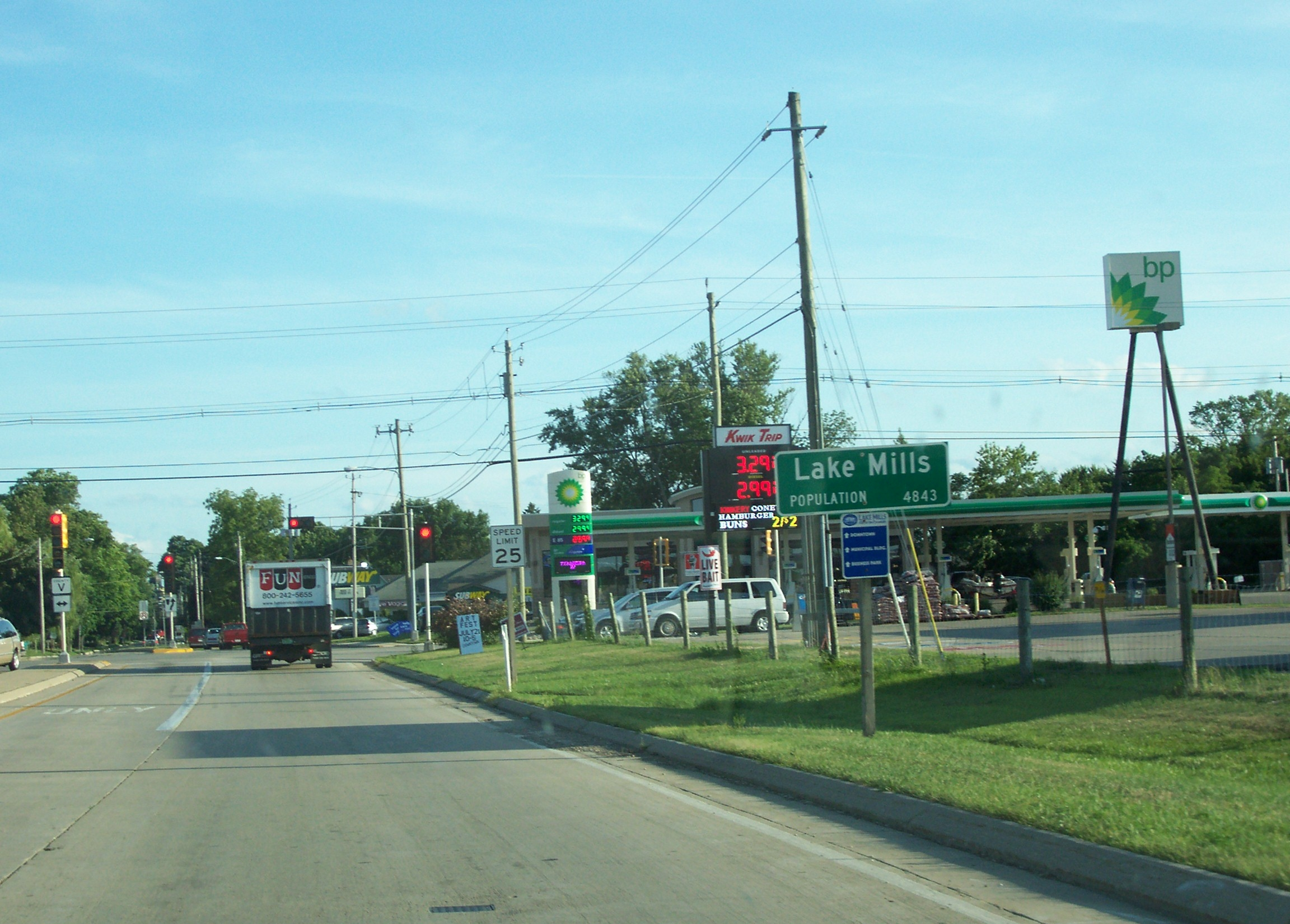
DOT sign

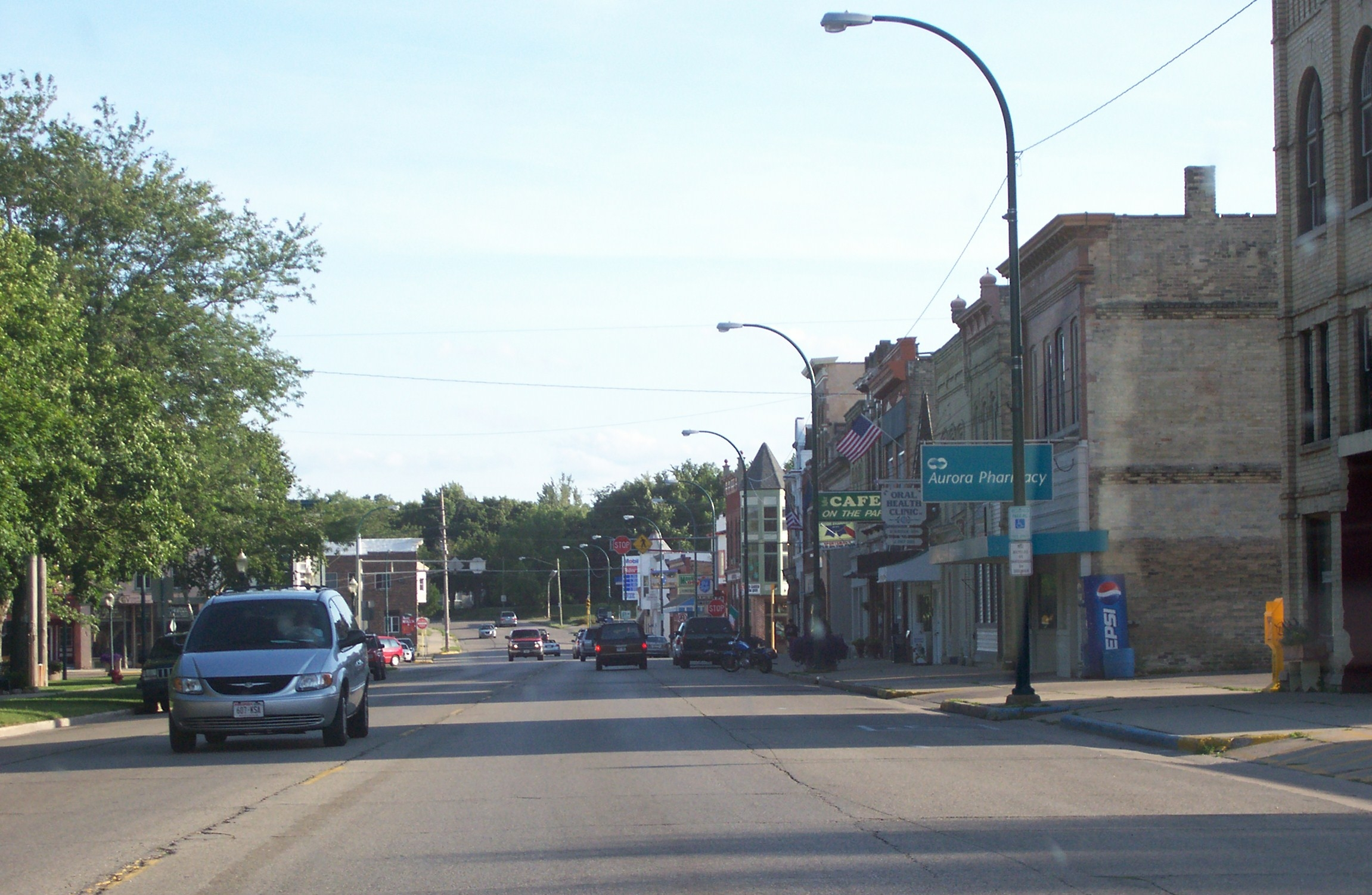
The west part of the town square on Highway 89

=== 2010 census ===
As of the census of 2010, there were 5,708 people, 2,319 households, and 1,503 families living in the city. The population density was 1,405.9 inhabitants per square mile (542.8/km^{2}). There were 2,776 housing units at an average density of 683.7 per square mile (264.0/km^{2}). The racial makeup of the city was 96.1% White, 0.7% African American, 0.2% Native American, 0.5% Asian, 1.2% from other races, and 1.3% from two or more races. Hispanic or Latino of any race were 3.8% of the population.

There were 2,319 households, of which 32.4% had children under the age of 18 living with them, 52.4% were married couples living together, 8.7% had a female householder with no husband present, 3.7% had a male householder with no wife present, and 35.2% were non-families. 28.2% of all households were made up of individuals, and 11.6% had someone living alone who was 65 years of age or older. The average household size was 2.42 and the average family size was 3.00.

The median age in the city was 37.2 years. 24.9% of residents were under the age of 18; 7% were between the ages of 18 and 24; 28.8% were from 25 to 44; 25.7% were from 45 to 64; and 13.5% were 65 years of age or older. The gender makeup of the city was 48.8% male and 51.2% female.

=== 2000 census ===
As of the census of 2000, there were 4,843 people, 1,924 households, and 1,289 families living in the city. The population density was 1,415.6 people per square mile (546.8/km^{2}). There were 2,065 housing units at an average density of 603.6 per square mile (233.1/km^{2}). The racial makeup of the city was 97.54% White, 0.17% Black or African American, 0.25% Native American, 0.87% Asian, 0.41% from other races, and 0.76% from two or more races. 2.33% of the population were Hispanic or Latino of any race.

There were 1,924 households, out of which 33.8% had children under the age of 18 living with them, 56.0% were married couples living together, 8.0% had a female householder with no husband present, and 33.0% were non-families. 26.8% of all households were made up of individuals, and 13.0% had someone living alone who was 65 years of age or older. The average household size was 2.49 and the average family size was 3.05.

In the city, the population was spread out, with 27.2% under the age of 18, 6.6% from 18 to 24, 31.0% from 25 to 44, 20.8% from 45 to 64, and 14.5% who were 65 years of age or older. The median age was 36 years. For every 100 females, there were 92.9 males. For every 100 females age 18 and over, there were 91.1 males.

The median income for a household in the city was $44,132, and the median income for a family was $54,131. Males had a median income of $36,394 versus $24,635 for females. The per capita income for the city was $21,929. About 5.3% of families and 7.3% of the population were below the poverty line, including 8.9% of those under age 18 and 6.1% of those age 65 or over.

== Media ==
Lake Mills is home to a weekly newspaper, The Lake Mills Leader.

== Education ==
The Lake Mills Area School District maintains an elementary school, a middle school, and Lake Mills High School.

St. Paul Lutheran School (3K-8) and Lakeside Lutheran High School are two Christian schools of the Wisconsin Evangelical Lutheran Synod in Lake Mills.

== Notable people ==
- Mel J. Cyrak, Wisconsin State Representative
- Palmer F. Daugs, Wisconsin State Representative
- Ernst F. Detterer, artist
- Nelson H. Falk, Wisconsin State Representative
- William Everson, Wisconsin State Representative
- Charles Greenwood, Wisconsin State Representative
- Carleton Bruns Joeckel, librarian, author, and advocate for public libraries
- Theodore S. Jones, Wisconsin State Representative
- Laura L. Kiessling, chemist
- Amy Kellogg Morse (1853–1905), President, Wisconsin State Woman's Christian Temperance Union
- Louis Wescott Myers, Chief Justice of the California Supreme Court
- Charles Phillips, Wisconsin State Representative
- Hal Raether, MLB pitcher
- Jim Wilson, Oklahoma state senator
