= Aztalan, Wisconsin =

Town of Aztalan, Wisconsin
- Town
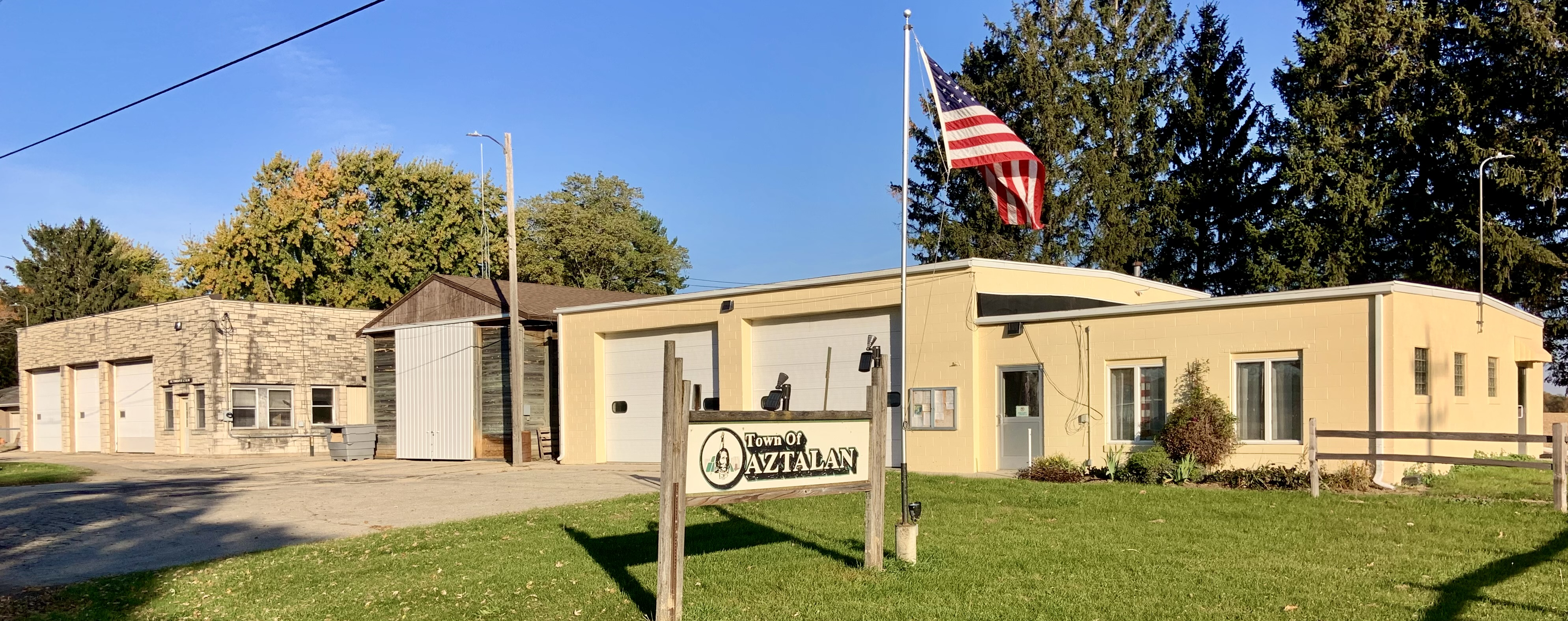
- Town hall

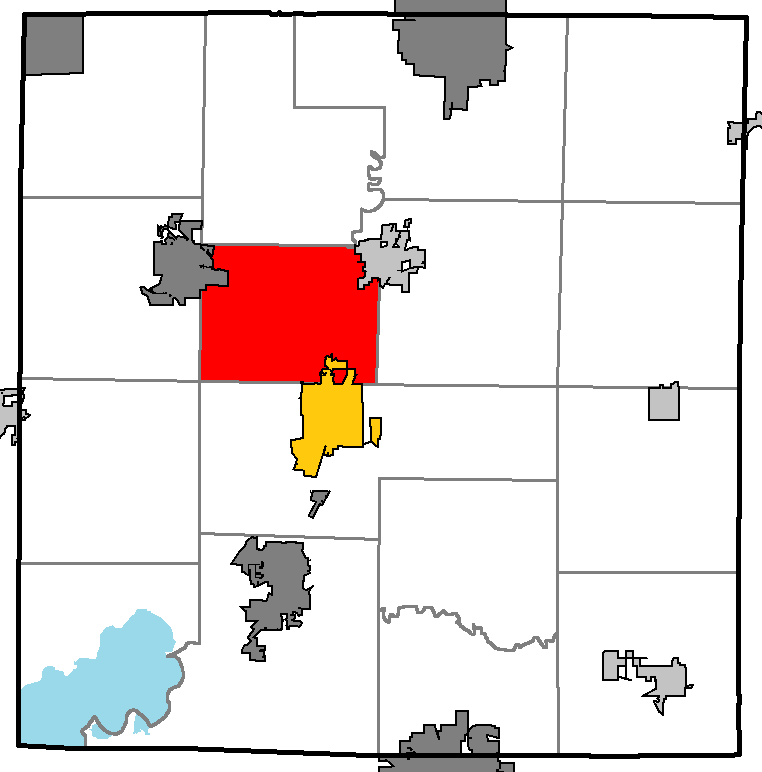
- Location of Aztalan, within Jefferson County

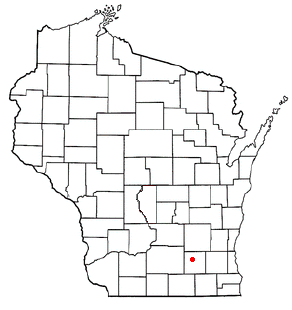
- Location of the Town of Aztalan, Wisconsin
- Coordinates: 43°4′N 88°51′W
- Country: United States
- State: Wisconsin
- County: Jefferson

Area
  - Total: 24.6 sq mi (63.8 km^{2})
  - Land: 24.1 sq mi (62.4 km^{2})
  - Water: 0.54 sq mi (1.4 km^{2})
- Elevation: 876 ft (267 m)

Population (2020)
  - Total: 1,382
  - Density: 57.4/sq mi (22.1/km^{2})
- Time zone: UTC-6 (Central (CST))
  - Summer (DST): UTC-5 (CDT)
- FIPS code: 55-04125
- GNIS feature ID: 1582739
- Website: https://www.townofaztalan.org/

Aztalan is a town in Jefferson County, Wisconsin, United States. The population was 1,382 at the 2020 census. The unincorporated communities of Aztalan and Jefferson Junction are located in the town.

== Geography ==
According to the United States Census Bureau, the town has a total area of 24.6 square miles (63.8 km^{2}), of which 24.1 square miles (62.4 km^{2}) is land and 0.54 square miles (1.4 km^{2}), or 2.17%, is water.

Aztalan State Park, the site of an ancient Mississippian settlement with two small, flat-topped platform mounds, is located in the town.

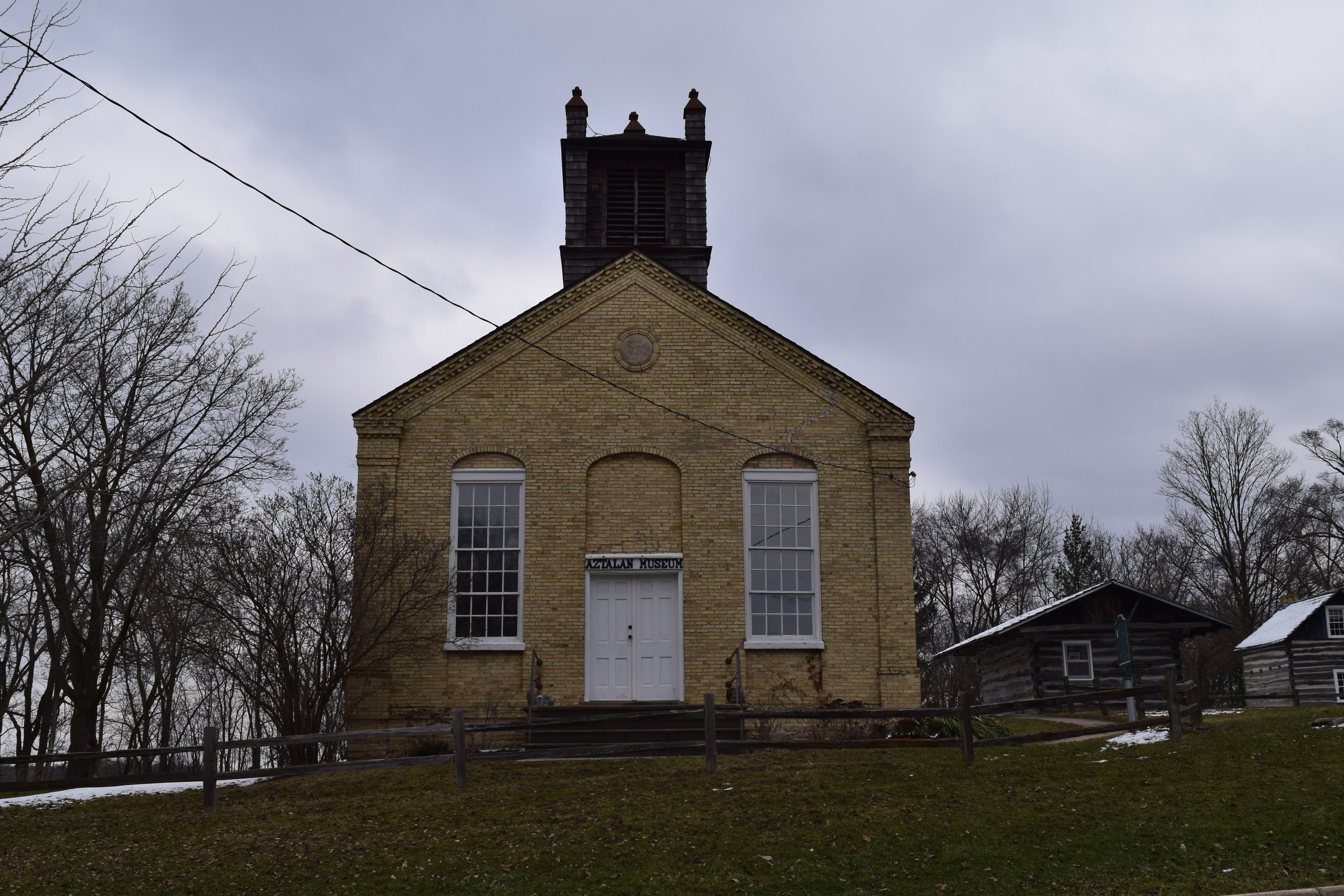
Pioneer Aztalan Site, Aztalan Museum

== Demographics ==
As of the census of 2000, there were 1,447 people, 530 households, and 433 families residing in the town. The population density was 59.2 people per square mile (22.8/km^{2}). There were 553 housing units at an average density of 22.6 per square mile (8.7/km^{2}). The racial makeup of the town was 98.48% White, 0.07% African American, 0.14% Native American, 0.35% Asian, 0.55% from other races, and 0.41% from two or more races. Hispanic or Latino of any race were 1.45% of the population.

There were 530 households, out of which 32.6% had children under the age of 18 living with them, 71.7% were married couples living together, 4.9% had a female householder with no husband present, and 18.3% were non-families. 14.7% of all households were made up of individuals, and 6.2% had someone living alone who was 65 years of age or older. The average household size was 2.73 and the average family size was 2.99.

In the town, the population was spread out, with 25.7% under the age of 18, 5.8% from 18 to 24, 29.4% from 25 to 44, 27.1% from 45 to 64, and 12.0% who were 65 years of age or older. The median age was 38 years. For every 100 females, there were 101.0 males. For every 100 females age 18 and over, there were 103.2 males.

The median income for a household in the town was $55,048, and the median income for a family was $59,598. Males had a median income of $37,188 versus $26,905 for females. The per capita income for the town was $23,193. About 0.9% of families and 2.2% of the population were below the poverty line, including 1.6% of those under age 18 and 5.7% of those age 65 or over.

== Notable people ==
- Frank E. Beatty, U.S. Navy rear admiral
- Henry C. Christians, Wisconsin State Representative and businessman, was born in Aztalan
- Charles Greenwood, Wisconsin State Representative and businessman, was born in Aztalan
- Sophronius S. Landt, Wisconsin State Representative, was born in Aztalan
