= Benjamin Nute =

19th-century Wisconsin pioneer

Member of the Wisconsin State Assembly from the Jefferson 1st district
- In office January 1, 1849 – January 7, 1850
- Preceded by: Wales Emmons
- Succeeded by: Abram Vanderpool

Personal details
- Born: August 12, 1800 Farmington, New Hampshire, U.S.
- Died: December 1, 1877 (aged 77) Waterford, Wisconsin, U.S.
- Resting place: Oak Hill Cemetery, Waterford, Wisconsin
- Party: Democratic
- Spouse: Sarah Brooks (m. 1824; died 1876)
- Children: 3 sons, 3 daughters

Benjamin Nute (August 12, 1800 – December 1, 1877) was a farmer and businessman from Milford, Wisconsin, who served a single one-year term as a Democratic member of the Wisconsin State Assembly from Jefferson County during the 1849 session (the 2nd Wisconsin Legislature).

== Background ==
Nute was born in 1800 in Farmington, New Hampshire. He spent some time in the boot and shoe industry, first in Boston and then in Utica, New York. He married Sarah Brooks in Utica in 1824, and their son Benjamin Jr. was born there. In 1837 he moved to Wisconsin Territory, becoming the first white settlers in what would become Milford (it was originally part of the Town of Aztalan). In 1840, he and frequent partner William Lamphear built a sawmill on the south side of the Crawfish River, and Nute built a 15-room hotel in the Milford village on the road to Aztalan proper. The first (wooden) bridge across the Crawfish, built there at the mill ford with funding from the Town of Aztalan was known as "Nute's Bridge". Nute would operate the hotel until selling out in 1858.

== Public service ==
In 1839, he was elected a county assessor. At the time he took office in the Assembly in January 1849, succeeding fellow Democrat Wales Emmons, he was reported to be 49 years old, a farmer from New Hampshire, and to have been in Wisconsin twelve years. For the 1850 session he was replaced by Abram Vanderpool, yet another Democrat.

== Personal life ==
In 1852, he was one of the three experts chosen to judge vegetables at the Wisconsin State Fair (then known as the "Wisconsin State Agricultural Society Annual Cattle Show and Fair") in such categories as "Best six heads of cauliflower", "Best twelve parsnips" and "Largest pumpkin". In 1859, he was elected a vice-president of the Jefferson County Agricultural Society.

Nute moved to Waterford before 1870, when he was elected "Supervisor" in the 1870 municipal election. In March 1877, he and partners bought and remodeled a sawmill and wooden products factory in Waterford. Nute died in Waterford on December 1, 1877, not long after his wife; they left three sons and three daughters behind.

Wisconsin State Assembly
| Preceded by Wales Emmons | Member of the Wisconsin State Assembly from the Jefferson 1st district January 1, 1849 – January 7, 1850 | Succeeded by Abram Vanderpool |
