= Milford (community), Wisconsin =

Milford, Wisconsin
- Unincorporated community
- Location within Wisconsin Location within the United States
- Coordinates: 43°06′03″N 88°50′48″W
- Country: United States
- State: Wisconsin
- County: Jefferson
- Town: Milford
- Elevation: 801 ft (244 m)
- Time zone: UTC-6 (Central (CST))
  - Summer (DST): UTC-5 (CDT)
- Area code: 920
- GNIS feature ID: 1569460

Milford is an unincorporated community located in the town of Milford, Jefferson County, Wisconsin, United States.

== History ==
Milford came into existence as a settler community along the Crawfish River in the mid 19th century. The name is generally attributed to the ford across the Crawfish just down from the sawmill built by early settler Benjamin Nute and his partner.
