= Rock Lake (Wisconsin) =

Lake in Wisconsin, United States

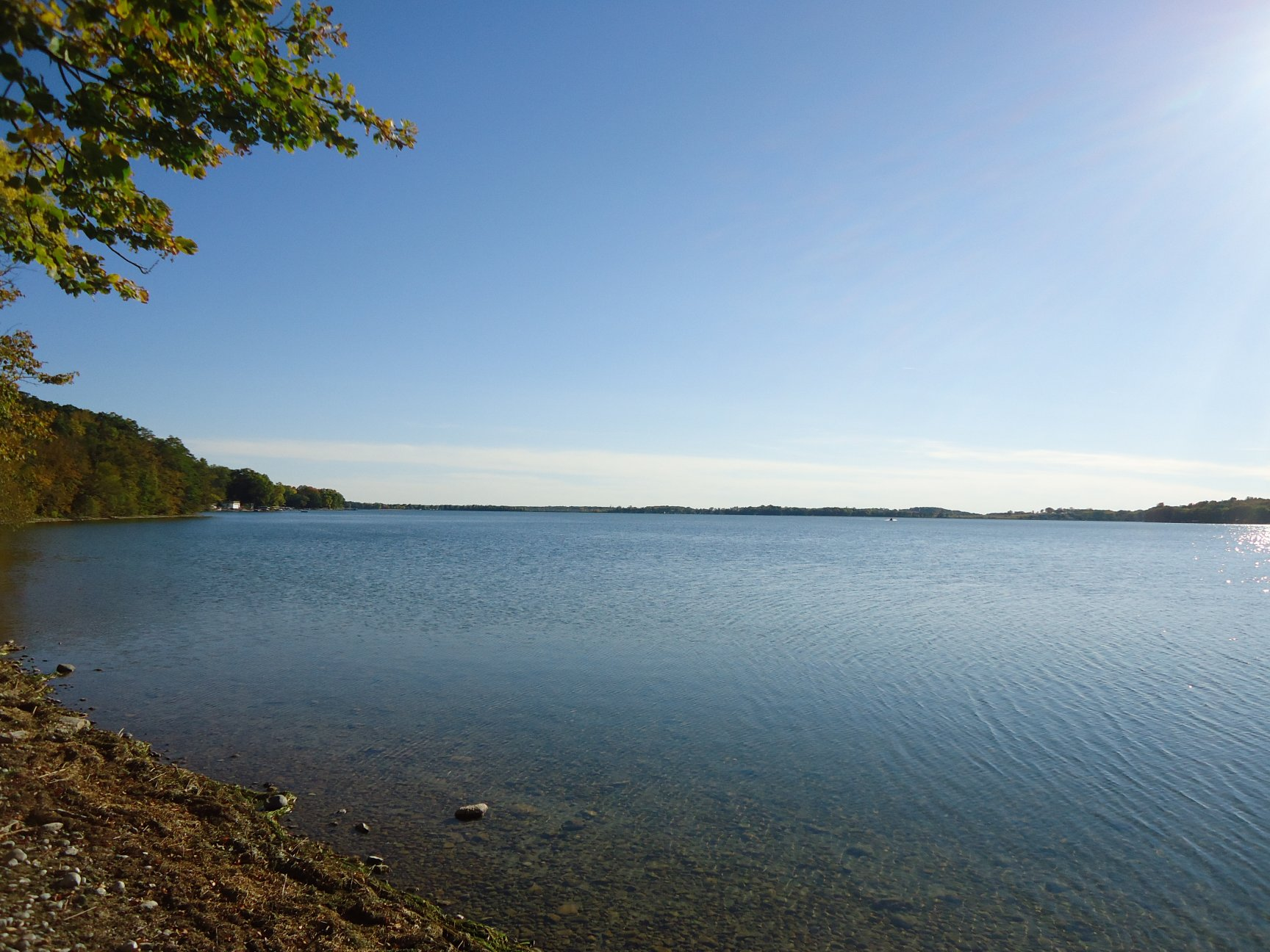
- View of Rock lake from a country park

- Location within Wisconsin Location within the United States
- Location: Jefferson County, Wisconsin
- Coordinates: 43°04′53″N 88°55′54″W
- Basin countries: United States
- Surface area: 1,365 acres (552 ha)
- Max. depth: 60 ft (18.3 m)
- Surface elevation: 823 ft (251 m)

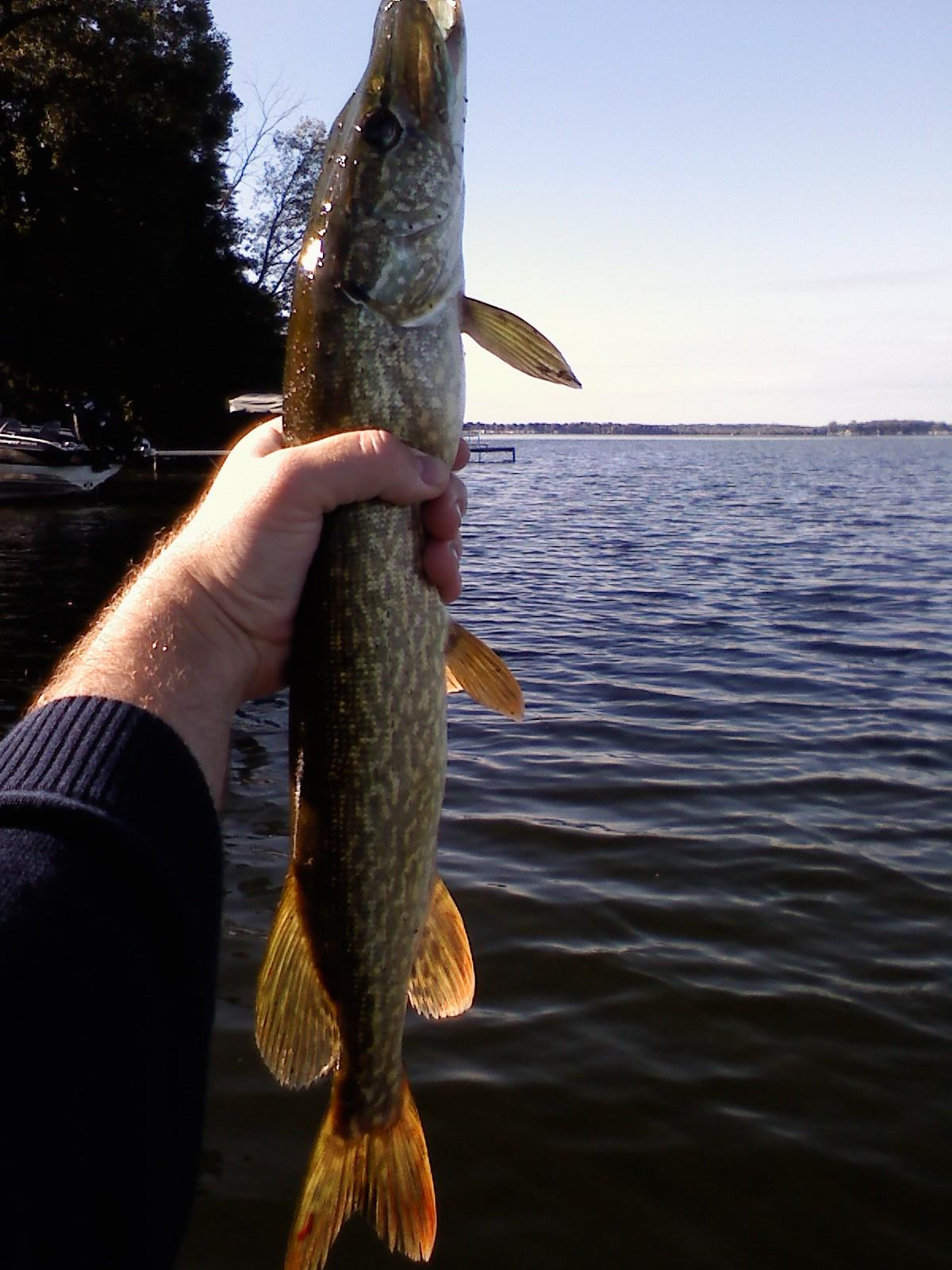
Northern Pike caught on Rock Lake and view of lake from northeast to south.

Rock Lake is a lake in Southeast Wisconsin, United States.

== Geography ==
Rock Lake is in south central Wisconsin, at Lake Mills, Wisconsin in Jefferson County, Wisconsin approximately 20 miles (32 km) east of Madison. Rock Lake is a 1,365 acres (552 ha) lake with a maximum depth of 60 feet (18 m).

The lake shape resembles a slight figure eight with several distinct areas. South of the figure eight portion of the lake lies Bean Lake State natural area which is a protected marsh. Part of the south western part of the figure eight is usually covered in tall aquatic vegetation that reach out of the water. In the north western portion of the figure eight there is a sand bar which often has boats anchored and is swimming accessible.

The Glacial Drumlin State Trail runs across an old rail road bridge across the southern portion of the lake. The trail separates the lake from the marsh area to the south of the lake.

== Pyramid claims ==
Rock Lake is perhaps most famous for its underwater rock piles frequently claimed to be pyramids built by the Mississippian culture at a time when water levels were much lower.

Mounds shaped like pyramids exist three miles (5 km) east of Rock Lake in Aztalan State Park on the Crawfish River in the town of Aztalan, Wisconsin. The park is a National Historic Landmark. The mounds are thought to have been built by the Mississippian culture and it is speculated that the site at Aztalan was a northern outpost of Cahokia, a much larger city in present-day Illinois not far from St. Louis, Missouri.

The waters of Rock Lake have been referred to as "Tyranena", (Tie-ruh-nee-nuh). That name has persisted in the area and is used by businesses, road names, and a park that is on the lake.

== Beaches ==
There are two public beaches, Bartel's beach and Sandy Beach; both are located in the south eastern portion of the lake.

== Fishing ==
Pike, smallmouth bass, largemouth bass, rock bass, pumpkinseed, bluegill, sunfish and walleye can be found in Rock Lake.
