= Milford, Wisconsin =

- Town
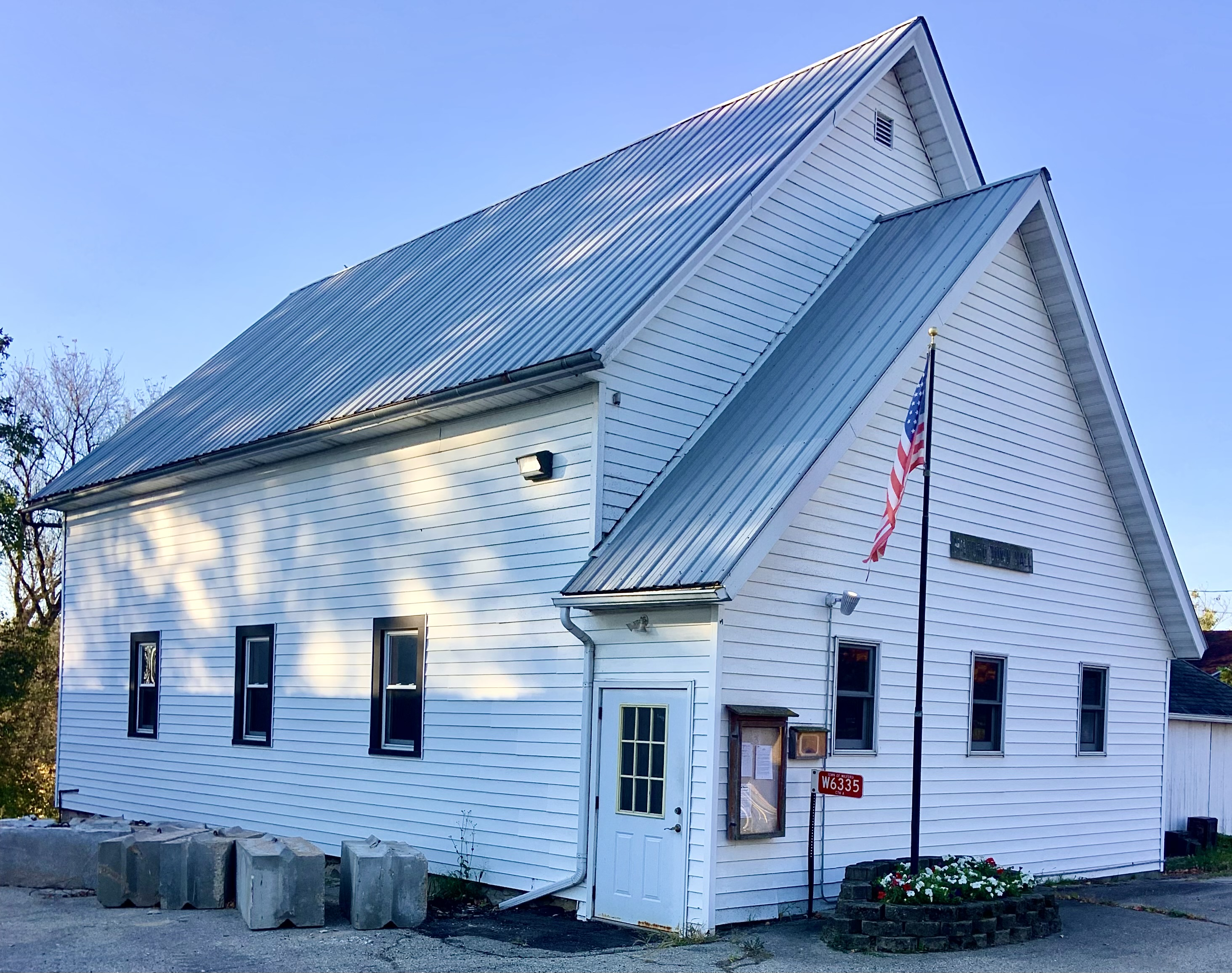
- Town hall

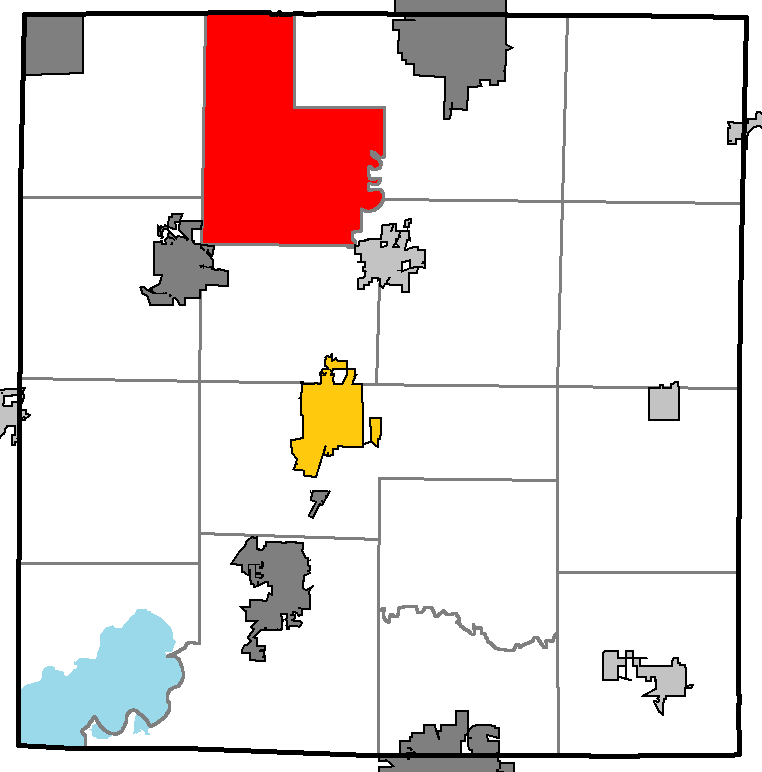
- Location of Milford, within Jefferson County
- Coordinates: 43°8′55″N 88°50′8″W
- Country: United States
- State: Wisconsin
- County: Jefferson

Area
  - Total: 35.1 sq mi (91.0 km^{2})
  - Land: 34.0 sq mi (88.0 km^{2})
  - Water: 1.2 sq mi (3.0 km^{2})
- Elevation: 827 ft (252 m)

Population (2020)
  - Total: 1,106
  - Density: 32.6/sq mi (12.6/km^{2})
- Time zone: UTC-6 (Central (CST))
  - Summer (DST): UTC-5 (CDT)
- FIPS code: 55-51850
- GNIS feature ID: 1583714
- Website: http://www.townofmilford.org/

Milford is a town in Jefferson County, Wisconsin, United States. The population was 1,106 at the 2020 census. The unincorporated communities of Grellton, Hoopers Mill, Hubbleton, and Milford are located in the town.

== History ==
A town along the Crawfish River, Milford came into existence as a settler community in the mid 19th century. The name is generally attributed to the ford across the Crawfish just down from the sawmill built by early settler Benjamin Nute and his partner.

== Geography ==
Milford is located in the southeastern part of the state, in Jefferson County, centrally located at the crossroads of County Highway 'A' and County Highway 'Q'. The town is situated along the banks of the Crawfish River, a tributary of the Rock River. The town extends towards Johnson Creek, Watertown, Waterloo, and Lake Mills.

According to the United States Census Bureau, the town has a total area of 35.1 square miles (91.0 km^{2}), of which 34.0 square miles (88.0 km^{2}) is land and 1.2 square miles (3.0 km^{2}), or 3.28%, is water.

== Demographics ==
As of the census of 2000, there were 1,055 people, 391 households, and 306 families residing in the town. The population density was 31.2 people per square mile (12.0/km^{2}). There were 411 housing units at an average density of 12.1 per square mile (4.7/km^{2}). The racial makeup of the town was 98.58% White, 0.09% African American, 0.19% Native American, 0.09% Asian, 0.19% from other races, and 0.85% from two or more races. Hispanic or Latino of any race were 0.95% of the population.

There were 391 households, out of which 32.0% had children under the age of 18 living with them, 67.8% were married couples living together, 4.6% had a female householder with no husband present, and 21.7% were non-families. 17.1% of all households were made up of individuals, and 4.1% had someone living alone who was 65 years of age or older. The average household size was 2.70 and the average family size was 3.03.

In the town, the population was spread out, with 25.5% under the age of 18, 6.6% from 18 to 24, 26.3% from 25 to 44, 27.4% from 45 to 64, and 14.2% who were 65 years of age or older. The median age was 40 years. For every 100 females, there were 110.2 males. For every 100 females age 18 and over, there were 114.8 males.

The median income for a household in the town was $47,619, and the median income for a family was $50,729. Males had a median income of $35,329 versus $25,163 for females. The per capita income for the town was $22,953. About 3.0% of families and 4.1% of the population were below the poverty line, including 3.9% of those under age 18 and 4.2% of those age 65 or over.

== Notable people ==
- Joseph Dorr Clapp, Wisconsin State Senator, lived in the town
- Mark R. Clapp, Wisconsin territorial legislator, lived in the town
- Nathan S. Greene, Wisconsin State Assemblyman, lived in the town
- Walter S. Greene, Wisconsin legislator, lived in the town
- Benjamin Nute, Wisconsin State Assemblyman, settled the town
