= Grellton, Wisconsin =

- Unincorporated community
- Location within Wisconsin Location within the United States
- Coordinates: 43°08′06″N 88°47′18″W
- Country: United States
- State: Wisconsin
- County: Jefferson
- Town: Milford
- Elevation: 846 ft (258 m)
- Time zone: UTC-6 (Central (CST))
  - Summer (DST): UTC-5 (CDT)
- Area code: 920
- GNIS feature ID: 1577622

Grellton is an unincorporated community located in the town of Milford, Jefferson County, Wisconsin, United States. The community was named for John F. Grell, an area butter and egg salesman.
