= Maunesha River =

River in Wisconsin, United States

Coordinates: 43°13′21″N 88°56′28″W

The Maunesha River is a 33.5-mile-long (53.9 km) tributary of the Crawfish River in south-central Wisconsin in the United States. Via the Crawfish and Rock rivers, it is part of the Mississippi River watershed.

== Course ==
The Maunesha is formed in the town of Bristol in Dane County from a collection of headwaters tributaries flowing from Columbia County. It flows generally eastward through northeastern Dane County (past the village of Marshall), northwestern Jefferson County (past the city of Waterloo) and southwestern Dodge County, where it joins the Crawfish River in the town of Portland.

An excellent public area to view this narrow fast-flowing river is in Waterloo at Fireman's Park.

== Photo gallery ==
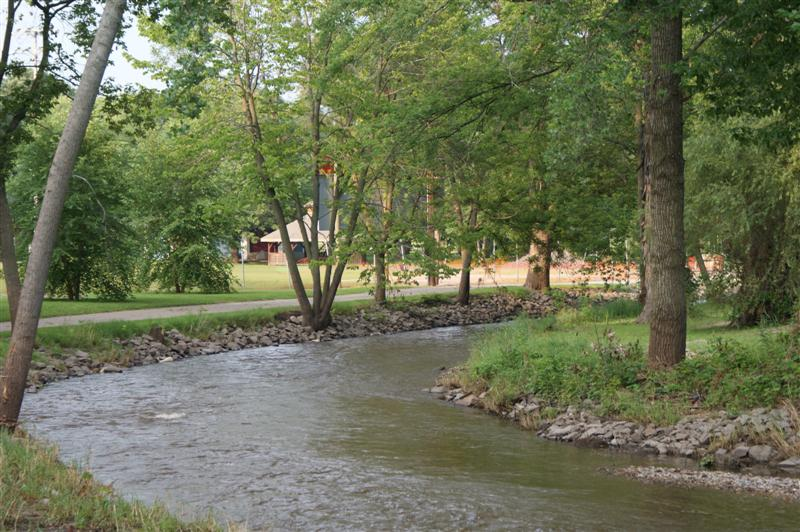
The river in Fireman's Park July 2008

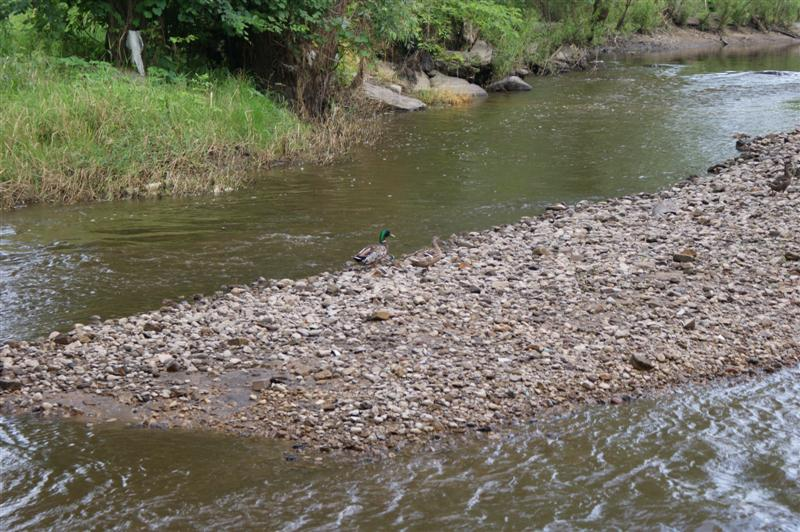
Ducks, Maunesha River

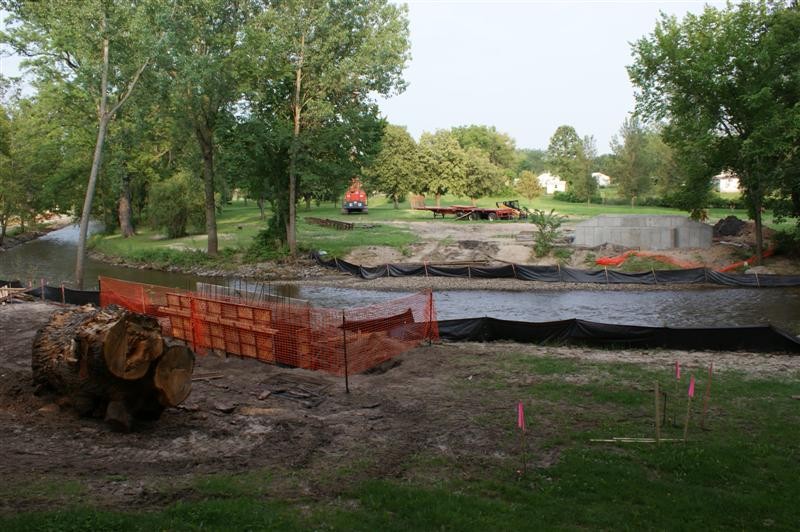
Building of new footbridge

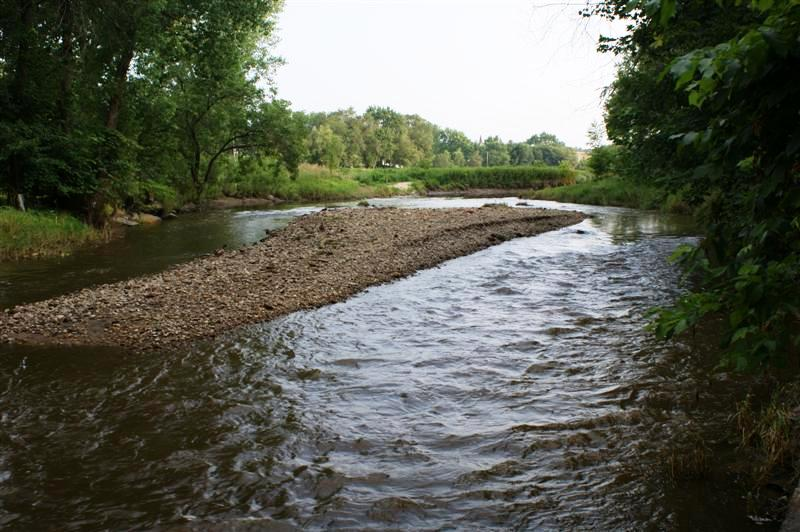
Upstream Firemans Park July 2008

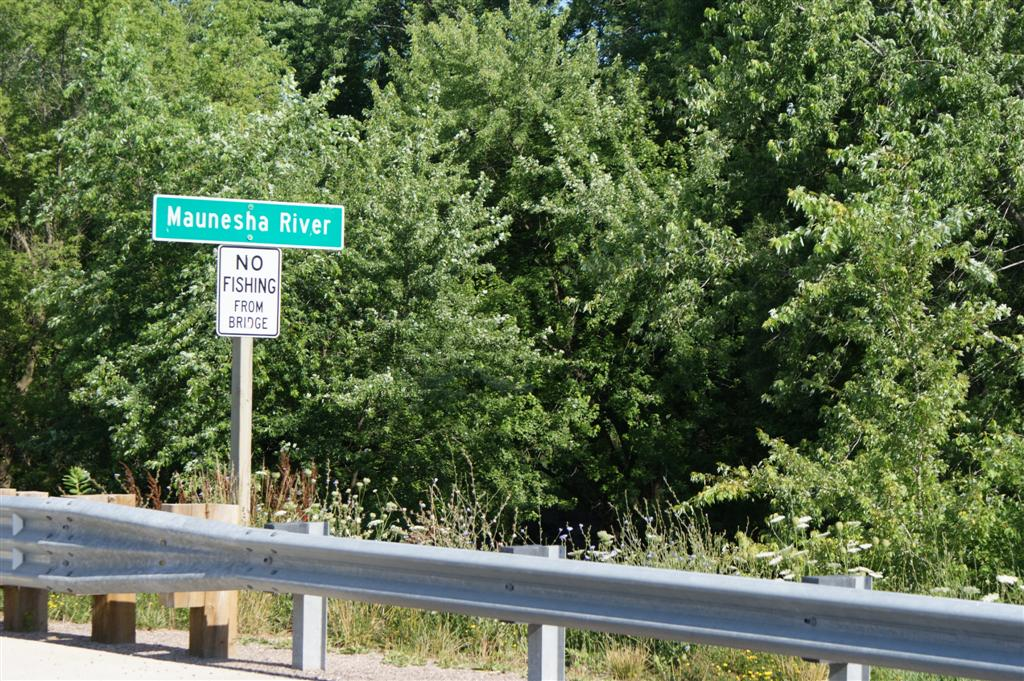
Sign on Hwy 19 by Portland

== Gallery of 2008 flood in Waterloo, Wisconsin ==
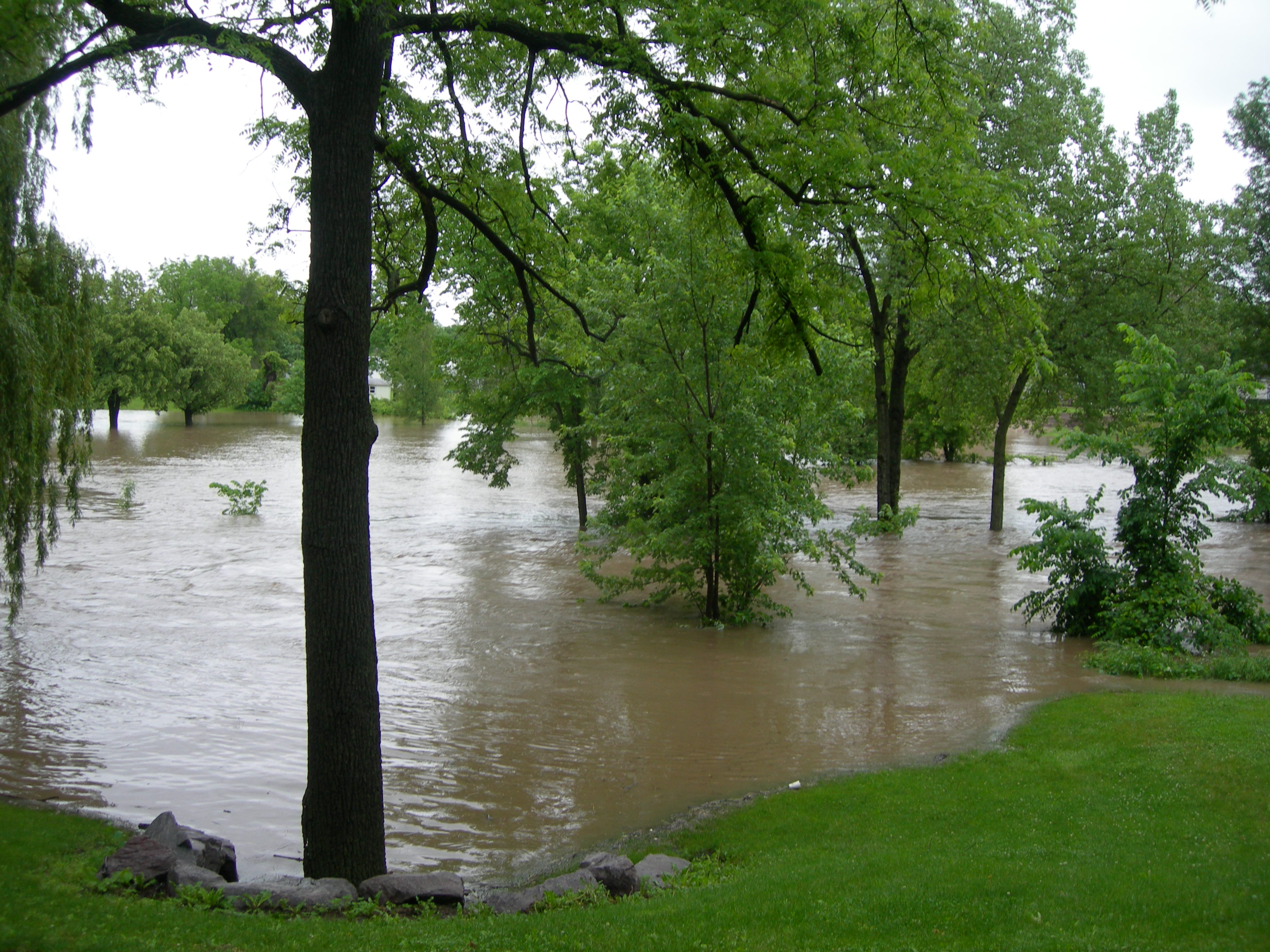
Bike path in Waterloo, Fireman's Park

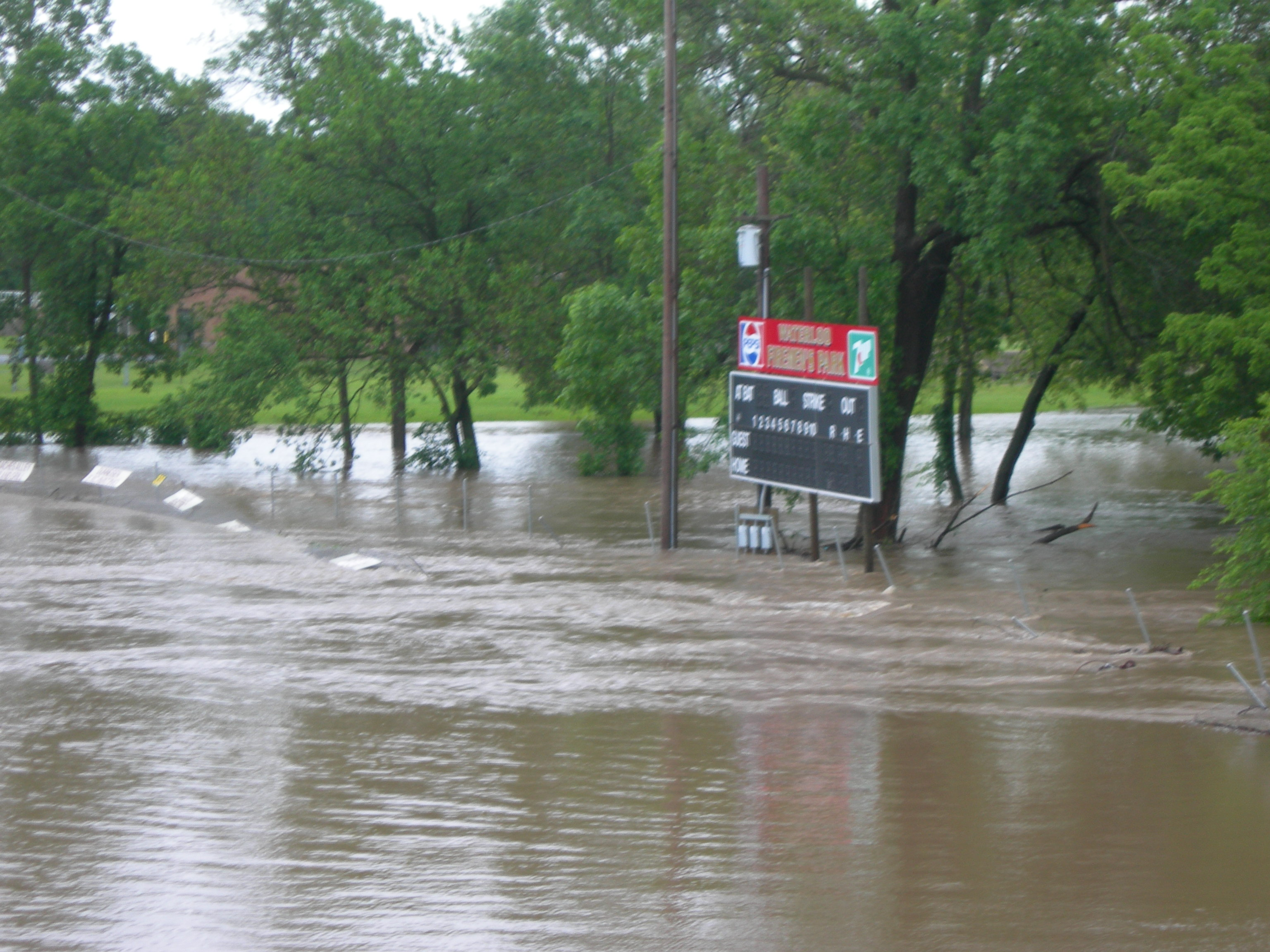
Waterloo Fireman's Park Scoreboard

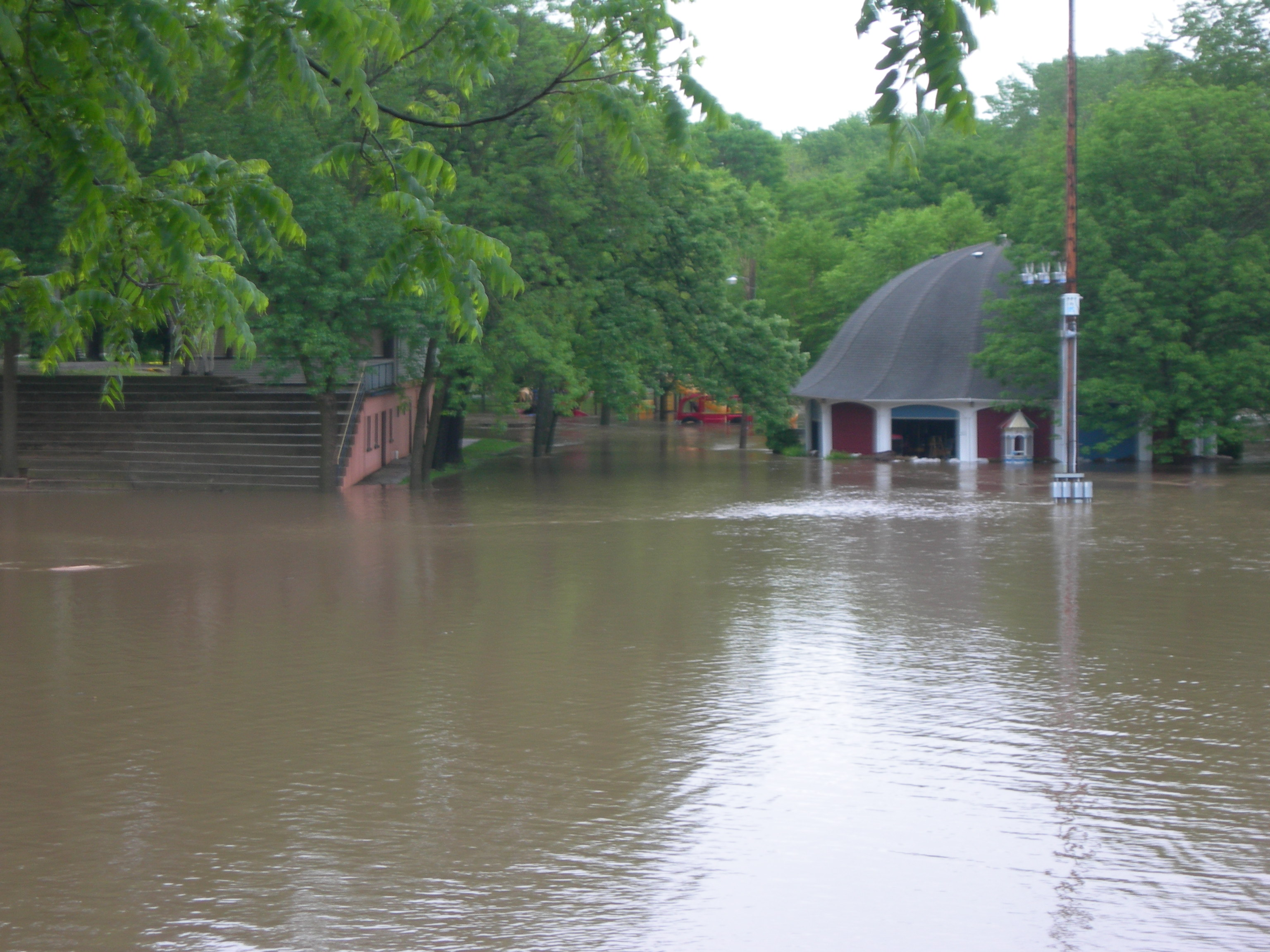
1911 C.W. Parker Carousel under water

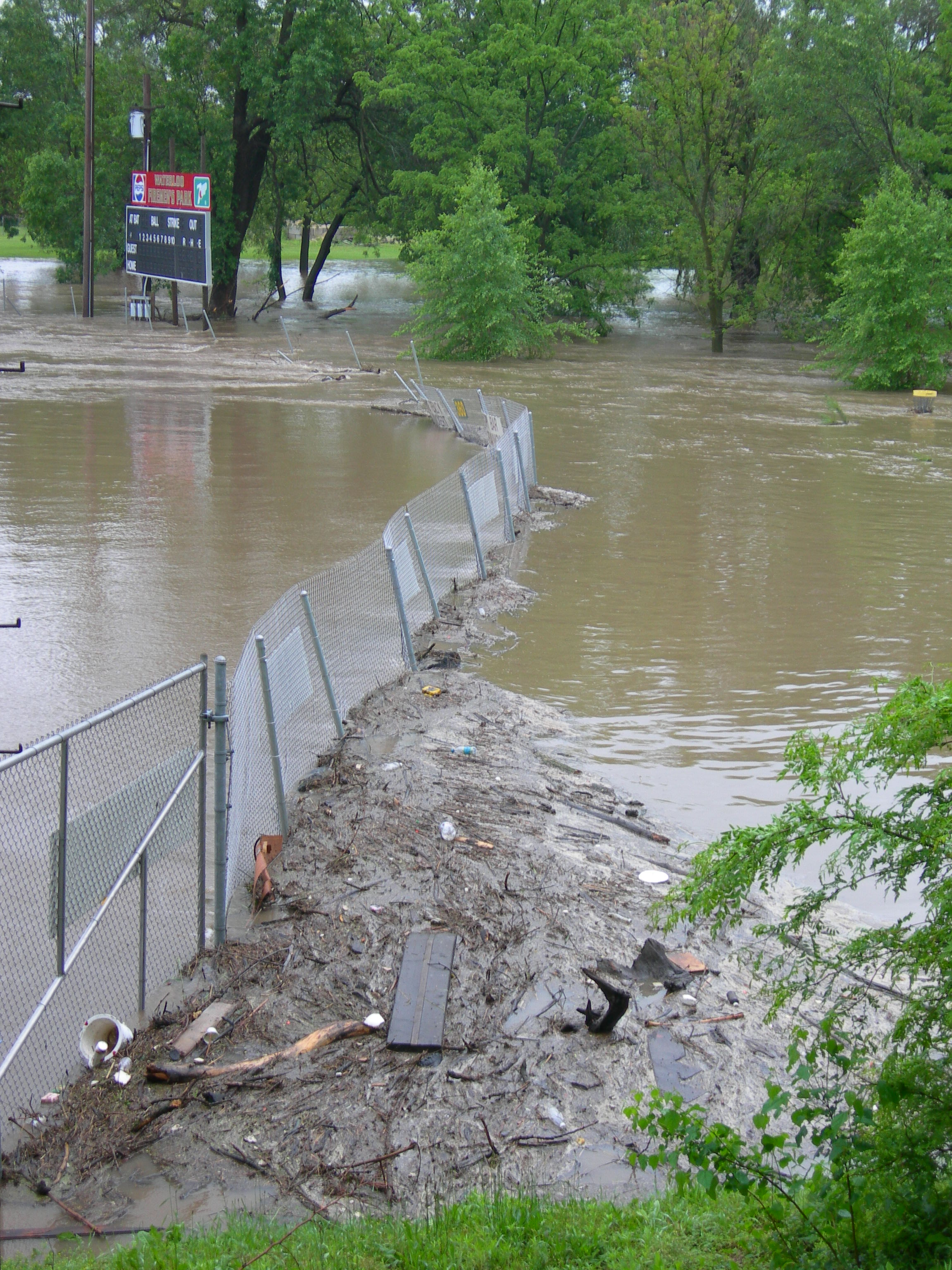
Fence for ball field flooded

== See also ==
- List of Wisconsin rivers
