= Glacial Drumlin State Trail =

State trail in Wisconsin, United States

Coordinates: 43°03′51″N 88°54′48″W

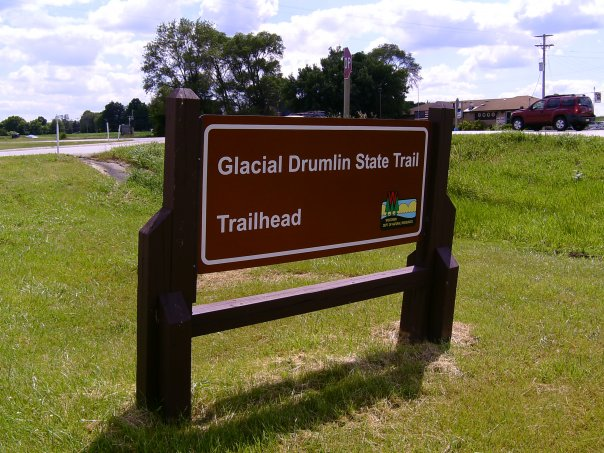
- Trailhead sign
- Length: 52 mi (84 km)
- Location: Wisconsin, United States
- Established: 1986
- Trailheads: Waukesha; Cottage Grove
- Use: Hiking and biking
- Surface: Asphalt and crushed limestone
- Website: dnr.wisconsin.gov/topic/parks/glacialdrumlin

The Glacial Drumlin State Trail is a multipurpose rail trail in the U.S. State of Wisconsin. It stretches 52 miles (84 km) from Waukesha (near Milwaukee) to Cottage Grove (near Madison). The trail travels through or near the Wisconsin communities of Cottage Grove, Deerfield, London, Lake Mills, Jefferson, Helenville, Sullivan, Dousman, Genesee, Wales, and Waukesha. In Lake Mills, it crosses Rock Lake on one of its many old railroad bridges. The trail was opened in 1986 and follows the old Chicago and North Western Railway (C&NW) Madison–Milwaukee mainline.

The name refers to a drumlin, a glacial landform very common in the area.

== About ==
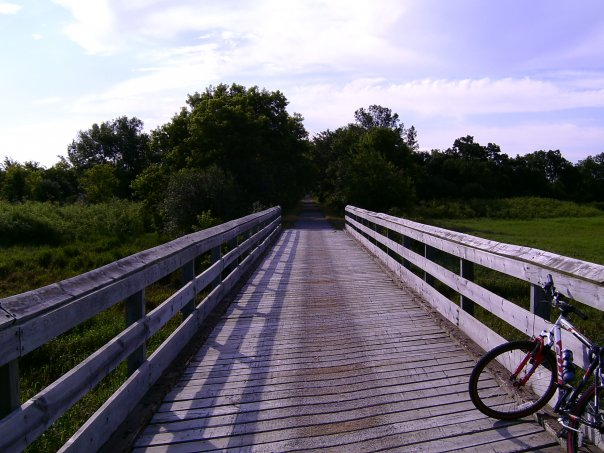
A wooden bridge on the trail

Traveling west from Waukesha, the trail runs continually for about 22 miles until reaching Jefferson. Near Jefferson, the trail takes a 1.5-mile detour where bikers travel along nearby low-traffic roads until reconnecting with the trail. Road signs guide travelers through this part of the trail.

The surface of the trail is paved with asphalt for the first 13 miles westward from Waukesha, then becoming crushed limestone for the remaining 39 miles.

Multiple rest stations are located at various locations along the trail. Most have running water and shade provided by an awning. Trail maps are also on display at these locations. Several parks along the trail provide restroom facilities and water.

16 wooden bridges are situated along the trail. Of these, two are more than 300 feet long and one, the Big Muck Farm Bridge, is more than 880 feet long; however, located several miles west of Lake Mills, it is currently closed due to flood damage suffered in 2008. A 0.7-mile detour is routed through Zeloski Marsh State Wildlife Area on the south side of the bridge. The decks of these bridges are constructed with 2x8 or 2x10 inch treated lumber attached over the existing railroad ties.

== Passes ==
Trail passes are required for any person age 16 or older for biking and in-line skating. A state trail pass is not required for walking, hiking, or skiing.

== Campgrounds ==
Camping opportunities near the Glacial Drumlin State Trail are available throughout the year at campgrounds in the Southern Unit of the Kettle Moraine State Forest, Lake Kegonsa State Park, the Capital Springs State Recreation Area, and at the Sandhill Station State Campground.

== Winter activities ==
Snowmobiling, cross-country skiing, and snowshoe hiking are permitted on the trail during the winter months. Snowmobiles are only permitted on the 39-mile limestone section of the trail but not on the paved asphalt section between Waukesha and Dousman. Snowmobiles must follow all Wisconsin snowmobile laws on this trail.

== Notes ==
The 5.1-mile section of the trail between Lake Mills and London is occasionally closed to accommodate aerial field spraying for farms in the area.
