= Aztalan State Park =

- Aztalan
- U.S. National Register of Historic Places
- U.S. National Historic Landmark
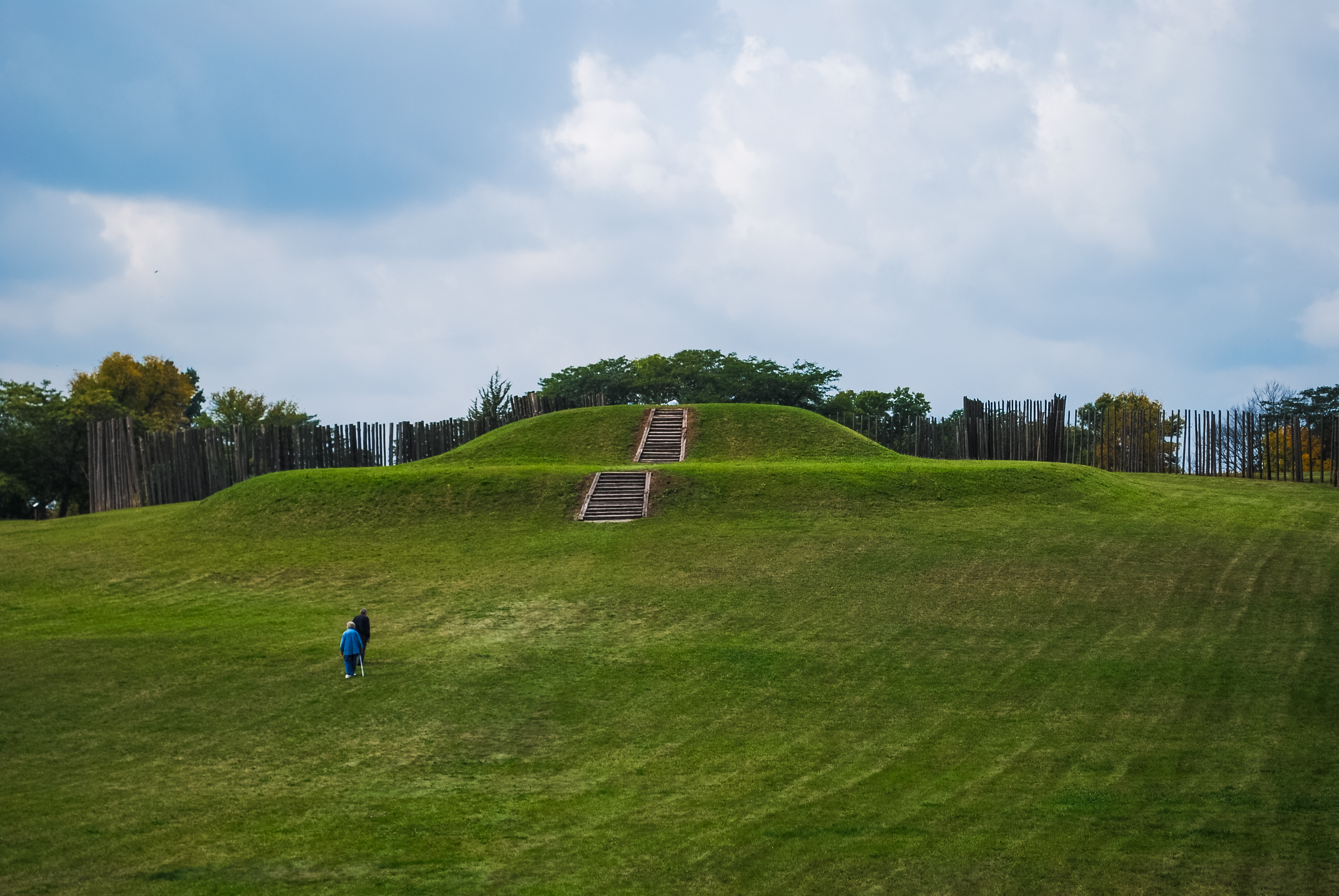
- Steps on the eastern face of the largest platform mound, Aztalan State Park

- Location within Wisconsin Location within the United States
- Location: Near Lake Mills on WI 89, Jefferson County, Wisconsin
- Nearest city: Lake Mills, Wisconsin
- Coordinates: 43°03′56″N 88°51′46″W
- NRHP reference No.: 66000022

Significant dates
- Added to NRHP: October 15, 1966
- Designated NHL: July 19, 1964

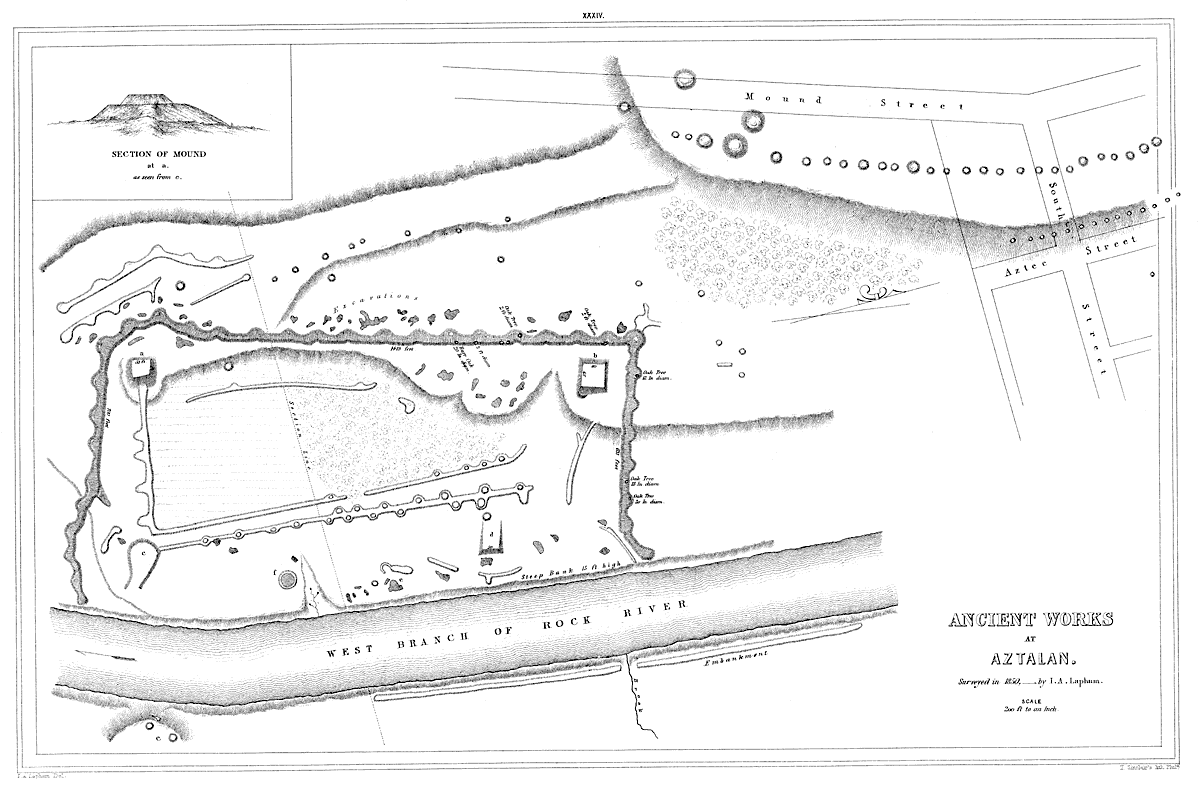
1855 map of Aztalan historical site; north is to the right.

Aztalan State Park is a state park in Jefferson County, Wisconsin, United States. Established in 1952, it was designated a National Historic Landmark in 1964 and added to the National Register of Historic Places in 1966. The park covers 172 acres (70 ha) along the Crawfish River.

Aztalan is the site of an ancient Mississippian culture settlement that flourished during the 10th to 13th centuries. The indigenous people constructed massive earthwork mounds for religious and political purposes. They were part of a widespread culture with important settlements throughout the Mississippi River valley and its tributaries. Their trading network extended from the Great Lakes to the Gulf Coast, and into the Southeast of the present-day United States.

== Pre-history (900–1300) ==
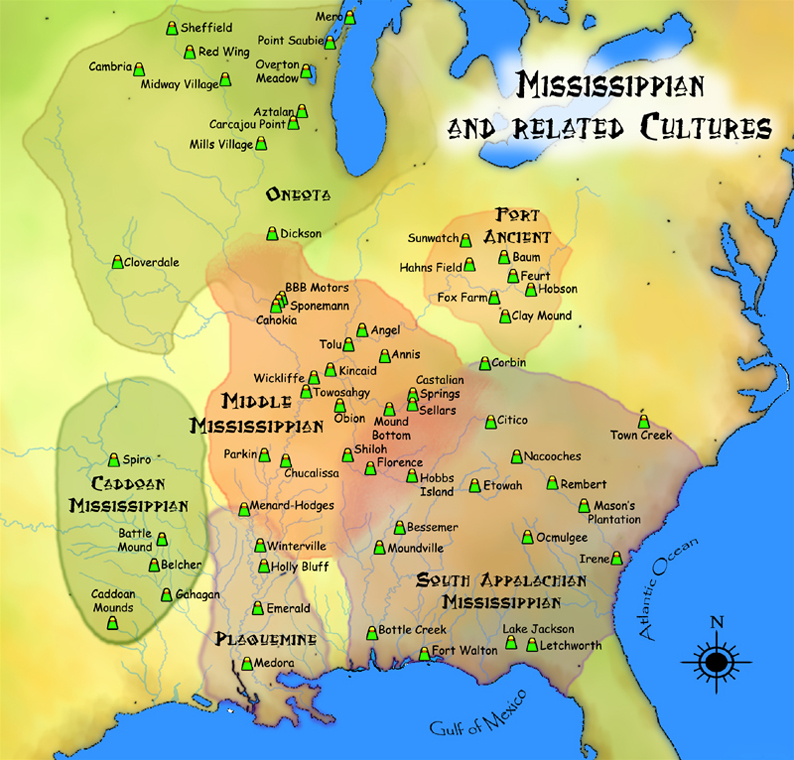
Approximate areas of Mississippian and related cultures. Aztalan is in the Oneota region of the map.

Aztalan was first settled around 900 CE by a Native American culture known as the Middle Mississippian tradition. The chief center of a Middle Mississippian settlement is at Cahokia, in present-day Illinois, a city that at its peak had 20,000–30,000 people. This was not surpassed by Europeans in North America until after 1800. These settlements are characterized by the construction of earthwork mounds, stockades, and houses, by decorated Mississippian culture pottery, and agricultural practices. There are also elements of the Woodland culture found there.

The residents of Aztalan had long-distance trading relationships with other settlements, linked by their use of the rivers for transportation. For example, items found at the settlement include copper from Michigan's Upper Peninsula, seashells from the coast of the Gulf of Mexico, and stone such as Mill Creek chert from other areas of the Midwest.

Sometime between 1200 and 1300 CE, the Aztalan settlement was abandoned. Archeologists and historians surmise they may have outgrown environmental resources, or encountered more warfare from other cultures, but do not know for sure. The Little Ice Age occurred soon after 1300 and may have contributed to farming difficulties, putting too much stress on the local chiefdoms.

=== Life in Aztalan ===
Most of the residents lived in circular or rectangular houses which they built between the river and the eastern secondary wall. The placement of the structures suggests that the layout was planned. The dwellings were built around a central ceremonial plaza likely used for rituals and public gatherings, as has been found at similar locations. Posts for the house frames were placed either in individual holes, or in a trench dug slightly narrower than the posts. The walls were completed with wattle and daub, a plaster mixture of grass and clay. The roof was covered with bark or thatch. The doorway usually faced south to keep out the winter's north winds. Inside, a single family slept on pole-frame beds, covered with tamarack boughs, deer skins, and furs. Sometimes a fire was kept in the middle of the house and a hole in the roof let out the smoke. Storage pits dug in the earthen floor of the house held foods such as corn, nuts, and seeds in woven bags. Perishable foods such as meat were most likely stored outside prior to cooking. Refuse pits for garbage and community storage pits were located outside.

The site was well chosen to provide a variety of food sources, and other resources. The staple of the diet was cultivated corn (maize), and other plants were also gathered as food, such as acorns, hickory nuts, and berries. Tobacco was grown at this time for sacred rituals, as tobacco seeds have been found at this site. The main source of meat was deer, especially in the winter. The people also caught and ate beaver, elk, fox, muskrats, and raccoons. They hunted birds and turtles, collected mussels, and caught fish in the Crawfish River directly next to the site. To help with fishing, the people set up rock barriers called fish weirs at key points, one of which is visible when the river is low. They caught catfish, bass, suckers, buffalo fish, pike, drum fish, and gar. They disposed of the thousands of shells from consumed mussels in middens. These have layers of shells several feet thick.

The people living here gathered food and resources for tools and building. Other materials were obtained through trade. Trees nearby provided wood for posts for house walls and stockades, bows and arrow shafts, and firewood. Smaller tree branches and grass were used for bedding and roofs. Shells were used to make jewelry, beads, spoons, and digging tools. The people dug river clay to use in fashioning fired pottery. Traded items, used for ornamental or ceremonial purposes, were an attribute of status because of their rarity.

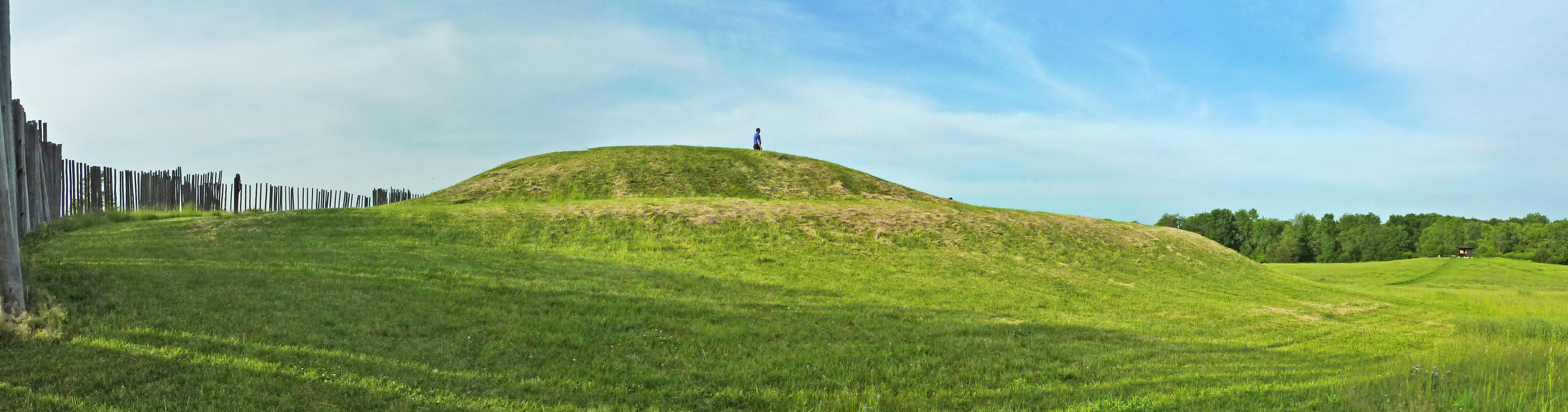
Largest platform mound viewed from the south and part of a stockade

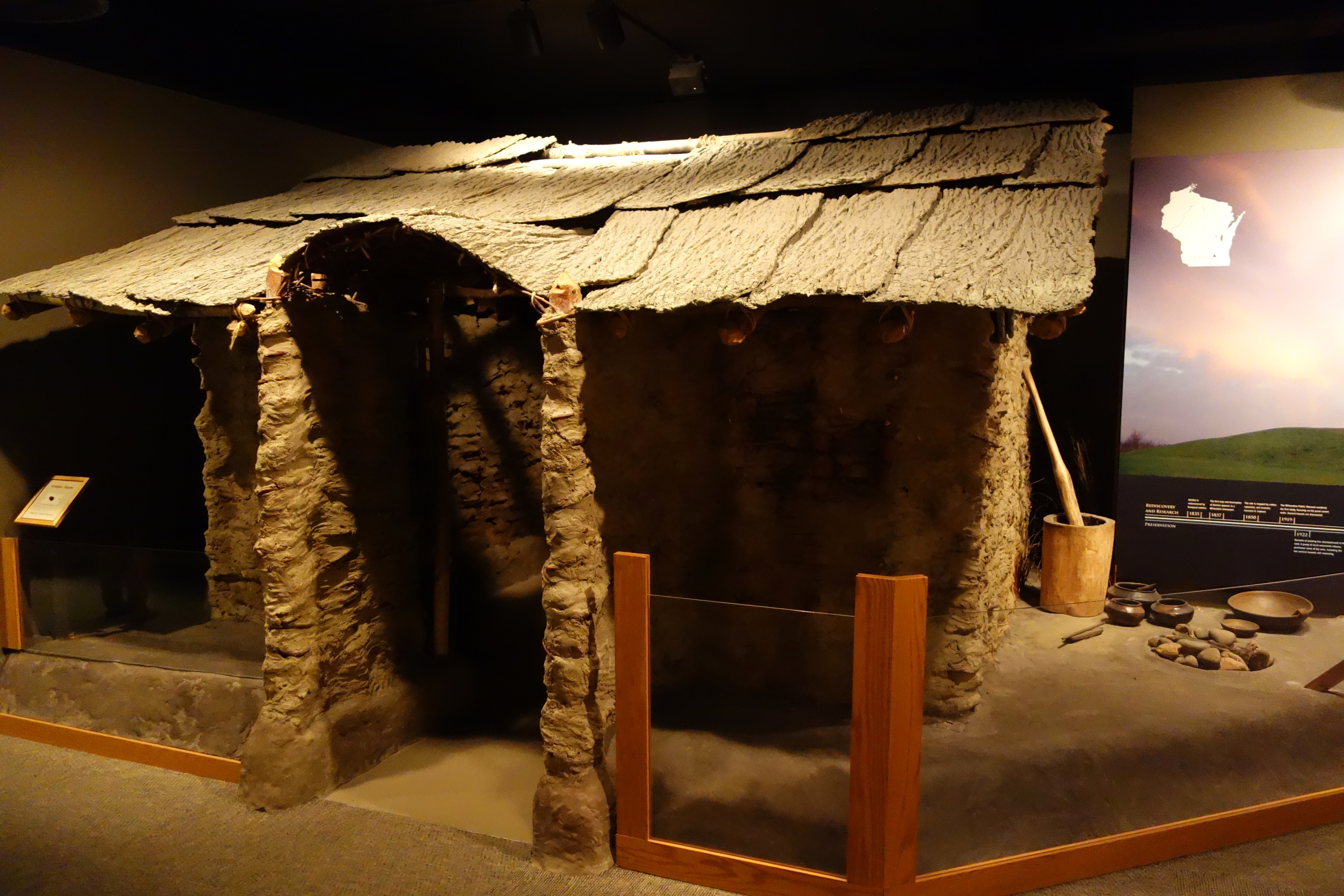
Replica of a house built over 1000 years ago at Aztalan from an exhibit in the Wisconsin Historical Museum

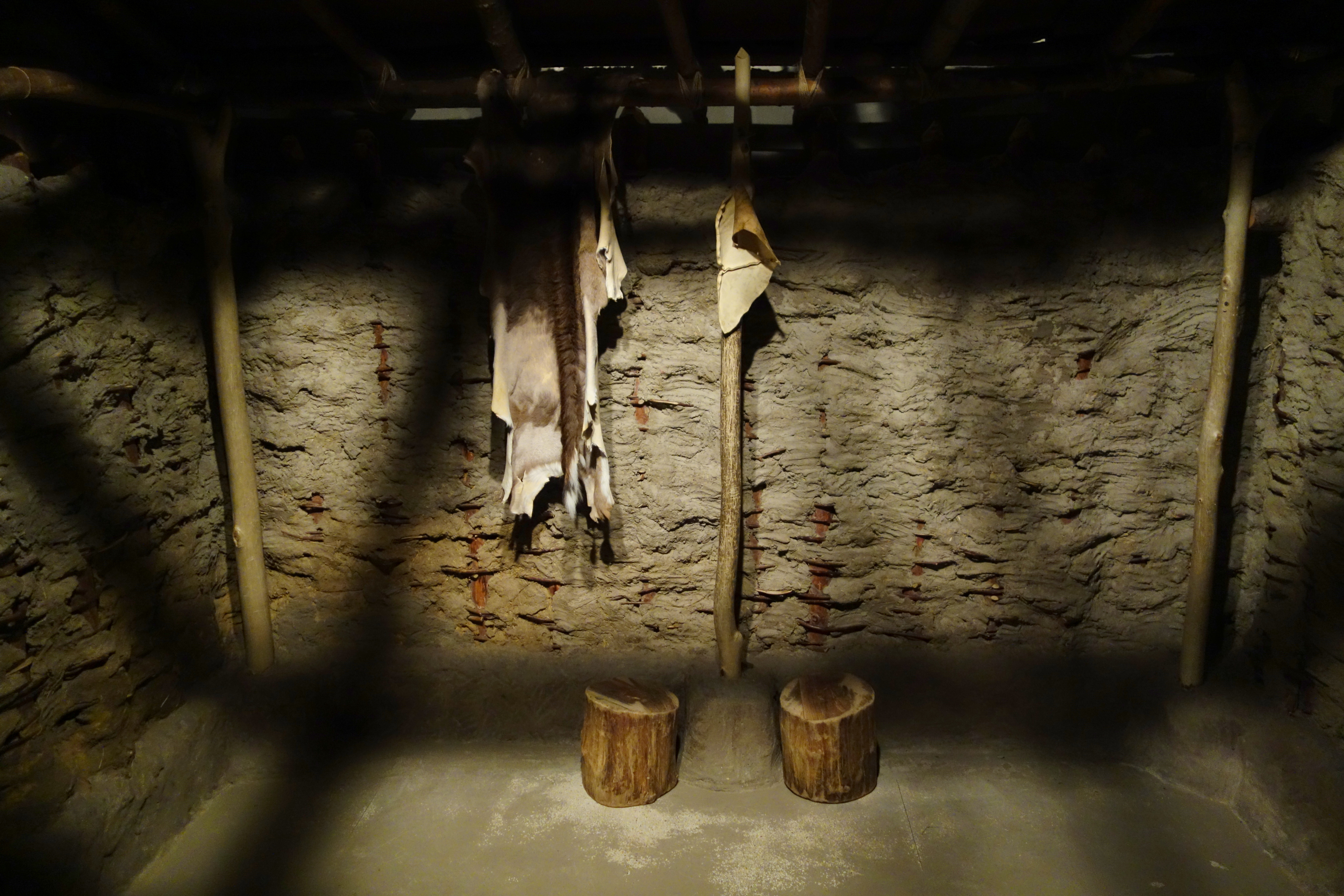
Interior of Aztalan house in museum exhibit

=== Physical features ===
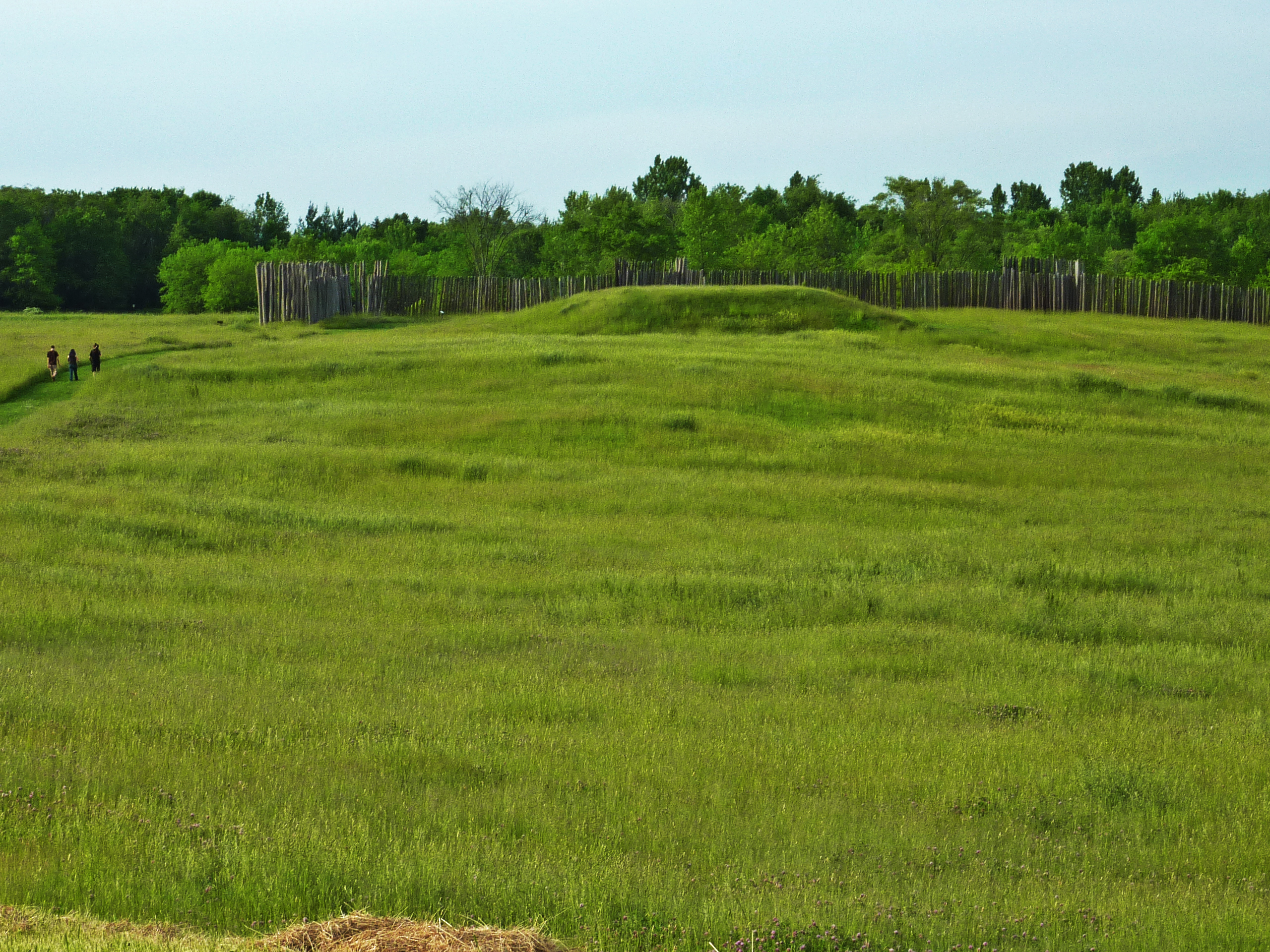
Reconstructed stockade behind the northwestern mound

The most obvious features of Aztalan are its pyramid-shaped, flat-topped platform mounds and the stockades, believed to have served both ceremonial and defensive functions.

==== Mounds ====
Three platform mounds remain on the site. The largest is the one in the southwest corner of the stockade; one almost as large is located in the northwest corner. The smallest of the three is along the east side of the settlement, near the Crawfish River (labeled "West Branch of Rock River" on the plates). The hill in the southeast corner is a natural gravel knoll, not built by the inhabitants.

The largest mound was built in three stages, with a set of steps leading to the top, where a structure was built over the entire flat top. The mound was covered with a clay cap, probably to enhance its appearance. Corn was stored in pits inside the structure. Scholars have several theories about why the corn was kept there, and the overall purpose of the structure. It may have been the storage facility for the entire village, or storage for food just for the top village officials; it may have been used for ceremonies and rituals; or it could have been a house for the village officials. This topmost structure was rebuilt each time a larger stage of the mound was built on top of the old.

The northwestern mound, used for formal burial, was also built in three stages. A special structure, approximately 4 by 2 metres (13.1 by 6.6 ft), with its long axis towards the northeast–southwest, was built on the west side of the mound. Its doorway was in its southwest corner, and the structure was covered with a mixture of clay, willow branches, and grass. The floor was covered with a mat of what may have been cattails. The bodies of ten people were placed side by side on this, with their heads toward the doorway. The bones of another person were bundled together with cord and placed near them. Once this construction was complete, and the bodies were inside, the building was burned.

The eastern mound had a large open-walled structure, about 12 by 27 metres (39 by 89 ft), built on top of it, with firepits lined with white sand inside. The function of this mound and structure remain unclear.

Additionally, to the northwest of the stockaded area, a row of round mounds extends northward. When archaeologists excavated in these mounds during the 1920s, they did not find the burial sites they had expected. Instead, each mound had a large post set in a pit in its center, surrounded by gravel and soil, with the pit capped with clay and gravel to hold the post steady. These mounds have been termed "marker mounds" because they may have been used to mark the site for travelers, but this is not certain. They may also have been used for announcements, message relays, or for calculations of astronomical phenomena, as has been found at other Mississippian sites, such as Cahokia.

==== Stockade ====
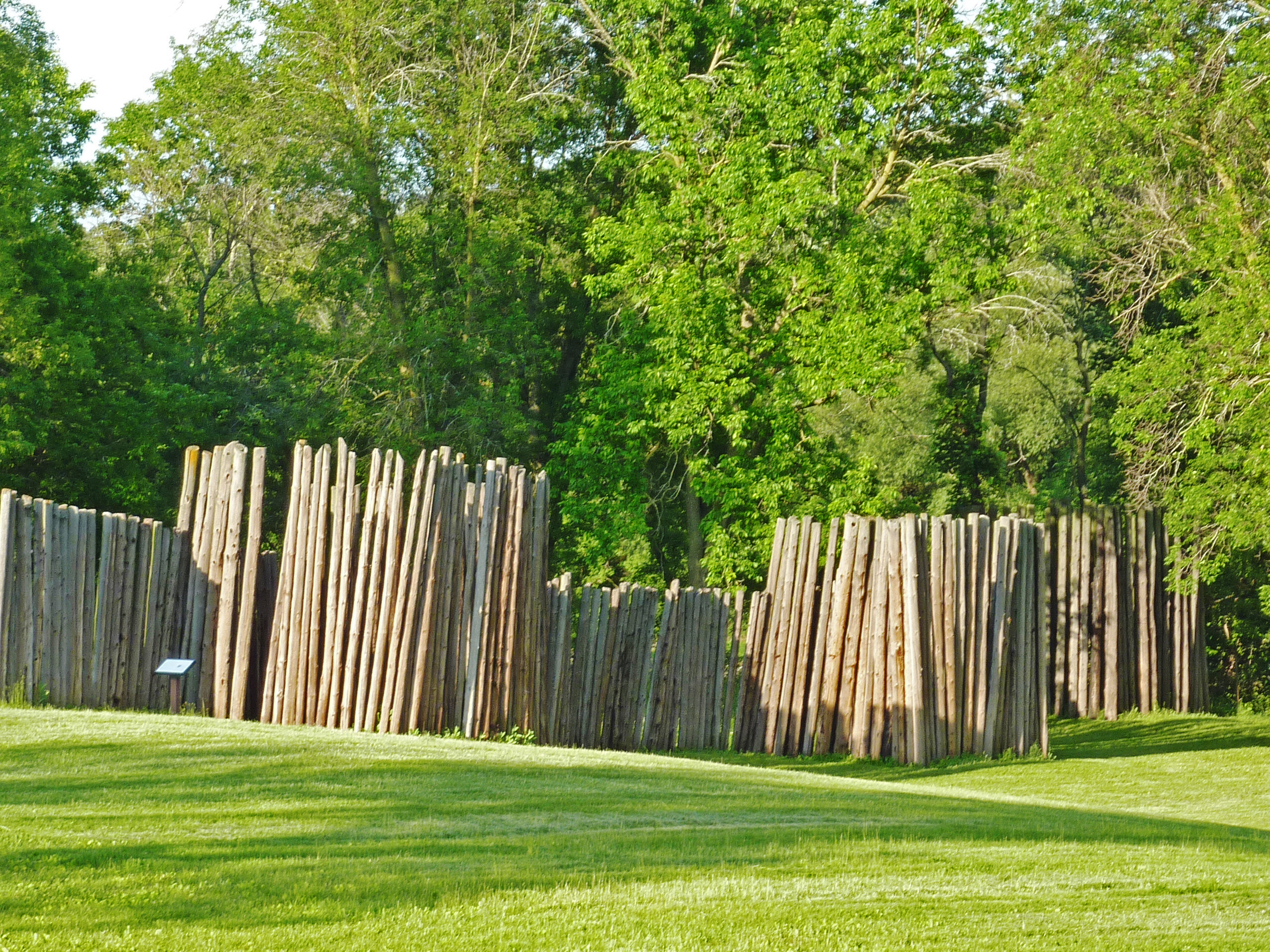
Reconstructed stockade near the Crawfish River

The settlement was surrounded on the north, west, and south sides by a palisade, a wall of logs set vertically into the ground. Narrow holes were dug into the ground, then the posts were lifted into position and set into the holes. The stockade was finished by people weaving flexible willow branches through the posts, and plastering the whole with a mixture of clay and grass to fill in the gaps, a technique similar to wattle and daub.

At some point, a smaller stockade was built within the outer one to delimit the dwelling areas. Archeologists have not been able to determine whether both stockades existed simultaneously, for a layered defense, or one was built after the other fell into disuse.

In 1850, Increase A. Lapham, an author, scientist, and naturalist, surveyed the site on behalf of the Smithsonian Institution, which was surveying ancient mounds. He described the outer stockade as being "631 feet (192 m) long at the north end, 1,149 feet (350 m) long on the west side and 700 feet (210 m) on the south side; making a total length of wall of 2,750 feet (840 m). The ridge or wall is about 22 feet (6.7 m), and from 1 foot (0.30 m) to 5 feet (1.5 m)) in height". It had at least 33 square bastions at regular intervals along its length, similar in form and placement to some European fortifications, to allow defensive warriors to cover that area by shooting arrows. In addition, others were built along the secondary walls. Rather than having a gate to protect the entrance, the builders constructed the entrance so that it was camouflaged from direct view and blended in with the wall on either side.

During the time Aztalan was inhabited, two sets of outer stockades were built. The posts of the first one eventually rotted, and the second one burned and was never rebuilt. It is not clear whether the purpose of the stockade was to keep out invaders, or if the occupants built it for another reason.

== Modern discovery (1835–1919) ==
A young man named Timothy Johnson discovered the ruins of the ancient settlement in December 1835. In January 1836, N. F. Hyer conducted the first rough survey of the site, and published his discovery in the Milwaukie Advertiser of January 1837.

According to Lapham:

The name Aztalan was given to this place by Mr. Hyer, because, according to Humboldt, the Aztecs, or ancient inhabitants of Mexico, had a tradition that their ancestors came from a country at the north, which they called Aztalan; and the possibility that these may have been remains of their occupancy, suggested the idea of restoring the name. It is made up of two Mexican words, atl, water, and an, near; and the country was probably so named from its proximity to large bodies of water. Hence the natural inference that the country about these great lakes was the ancient residence of the Aztecs.

Hyer wrote, "We are determined to preserve these ruins from being ruined." However, in 1838, President Martin Van Buren refused a request by Massachusetts statesman Edward Everett to withdraw the site from public sale, and it was sold for $22. In the following years, the surface was plowed, the mounds were leveled for easier farming, pottery shards and "Aztalan brick" were hauled away by the wagonload to fill in potholes in township roads, and souvenir hunters took numerous artifacts.

In 1850, Lapham urged the preservation of the stockade. At the time, the stockade was still standing, though not in the condition it had once been.

== State park foundation and reconstruction (1919–present) ==
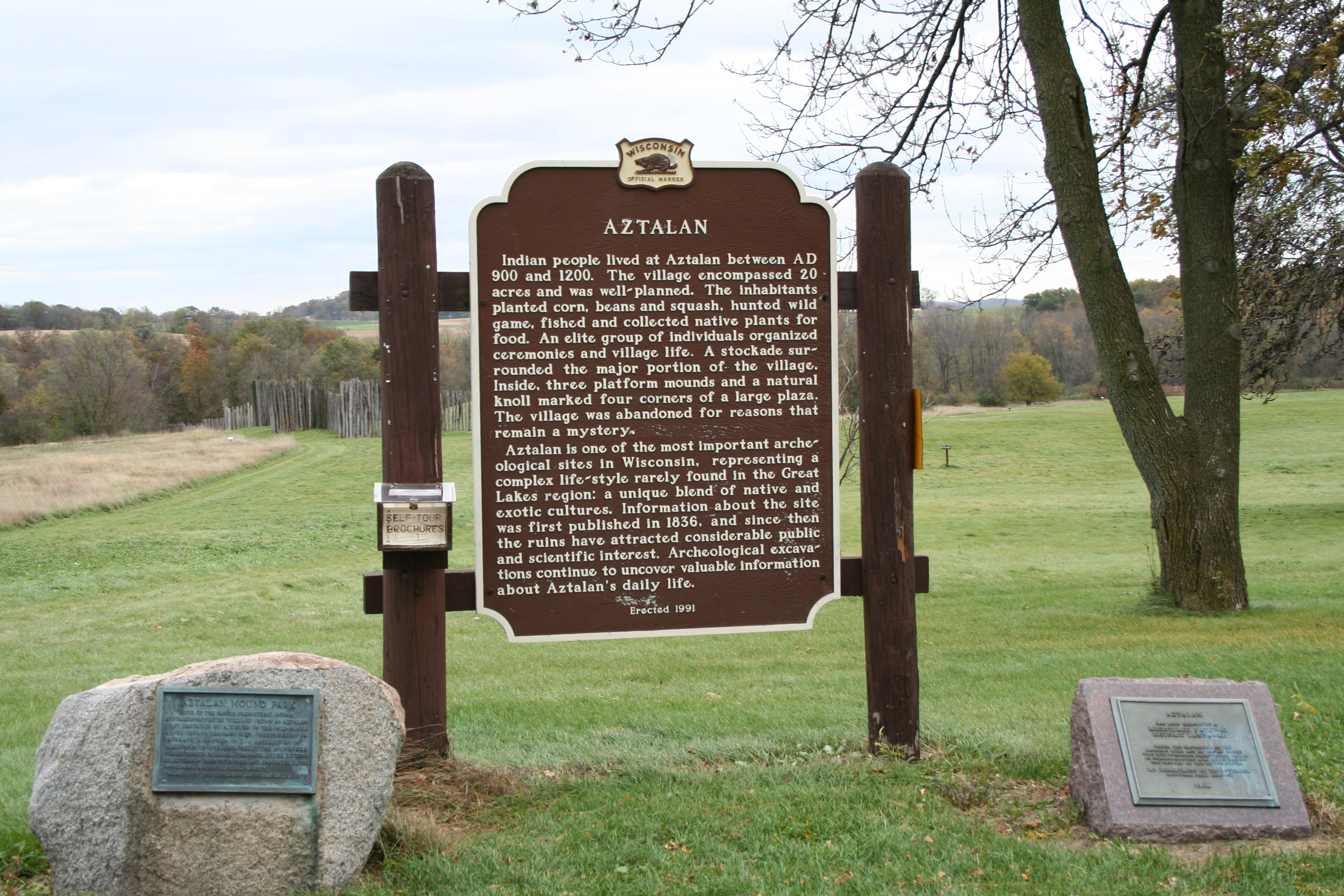
Historic marker for Aztalan State Park

In 1919, archeological excavations began at Aztalan under the direction of Dr. S. A. Barrett. In 1920, the Landmarks Committee of the State Historical Society of Wisconsin, under Publius V. Lawson, started a new effort to save what remained of Aztalan, supported by the Friends of Our Native Landscape and the Wisconsin Archeological Society. They made their first purchase of some of the land in 1921, three acres (12,000 m^{2})) west of the stockade and containing eight conical mounds, and presented it to the Wisconsin Archeological Society.

Work for preservation continued. In 1936, the state's archeological and historical societies petitioned the federal government for funds to reconstruct the stockade, without success, although during the Great Depression the US funded archeological work and preservation at numerous ancient sites around the country. In 1941, the newly founded Lake Mills-Aztalan Historical Society began an energetic campaign to preserve the stockade area.

In 1945, the Wisconsin State Assembly passed a bill directing the State Planning Board to study the possibility of establishing a state park at Aztalan. In 1947, the Wisconsin State Legislature passed a resolution requesting the State Conservation Commission to purchase Aztalan. 120 acres (490,000 m^{2}) were purchased to this end in 1948, and the Wisconsin Archeological Society and the Lake Mills-Aztalan Historical Society donated their holdings. Aztalan opened to the public in 1952 as Aztalan State Park.

Aztalan was designated a registered National Historic Landmark in 1964 and added to the National Register of Historic Places in 1966. In 1968, the state reconstructed portions of the stockade wall by placing new posts in the original holes. A section of this was also covered with the wattle and daub, but this has since worn away or been removed.

== See also ==
- List of National Historic Landmarks in Wisconsin
- National Register of Historic Places listings in Jefferson County, Wisconsin
- Rock Lake, Wisconsin
