= Marshall, Dane County, Wisconsin =

Marshall
- Village
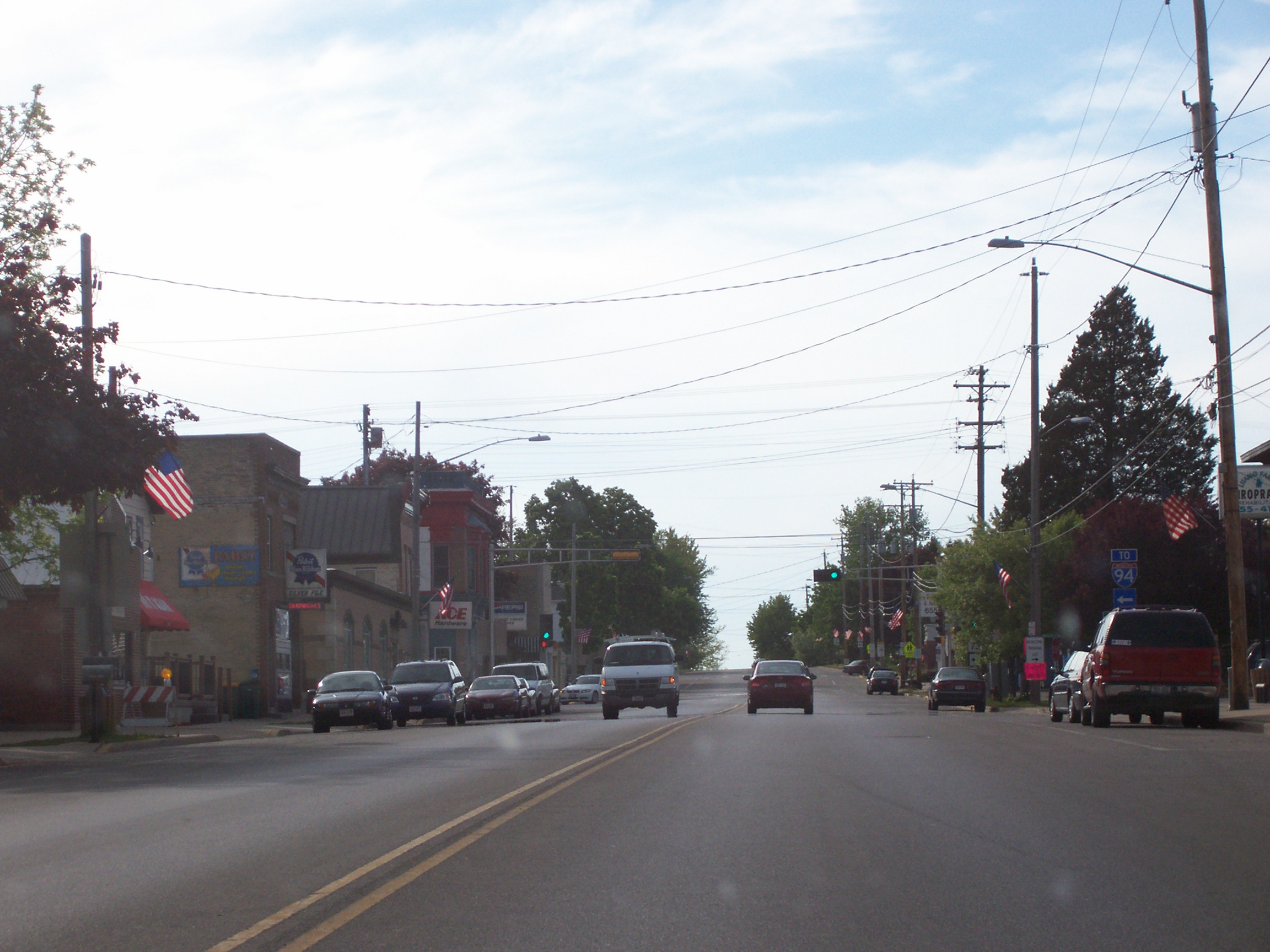
- Downtown Marshall
- Motto: Expanding Our Community's Horizon!
- Location of Marshall in Dane County, Wisconsin.
- Coordinates: 43°10′16″N 89°3′53″W
- Country: United States
- State: Wisconsin
- County: Dane

Government
  - Type: Village
  - Village president: Chris Campbell

Area
  - Total: 2.29 sq mi (5.93 km^{2})
  - Land: 2.12 sq mi (5.50 km^{2})
  - Water: 0.17 sq mi (0.43 km^{2})

Population (2020)
  - Total: 3,787
  - Density: 1,780/sq mi (689/km^{2})
- Time zone: UTC-6 (Central (CST))
  - Summer (DST): UTC-5 (CDT)
- ZIP codes: 53559
- Area code: 608
- FIPS code: 55-49575
- GNIS feature ID: 1583662
- Website: marshall-wi.com

Marshall is a village in Dane County, Wisconsin, United States, along the Maunesha River. The population was 3,787 at the 2020 United States Census. It is part of the Madison, Wisconsin metropolitan area.

== History ==
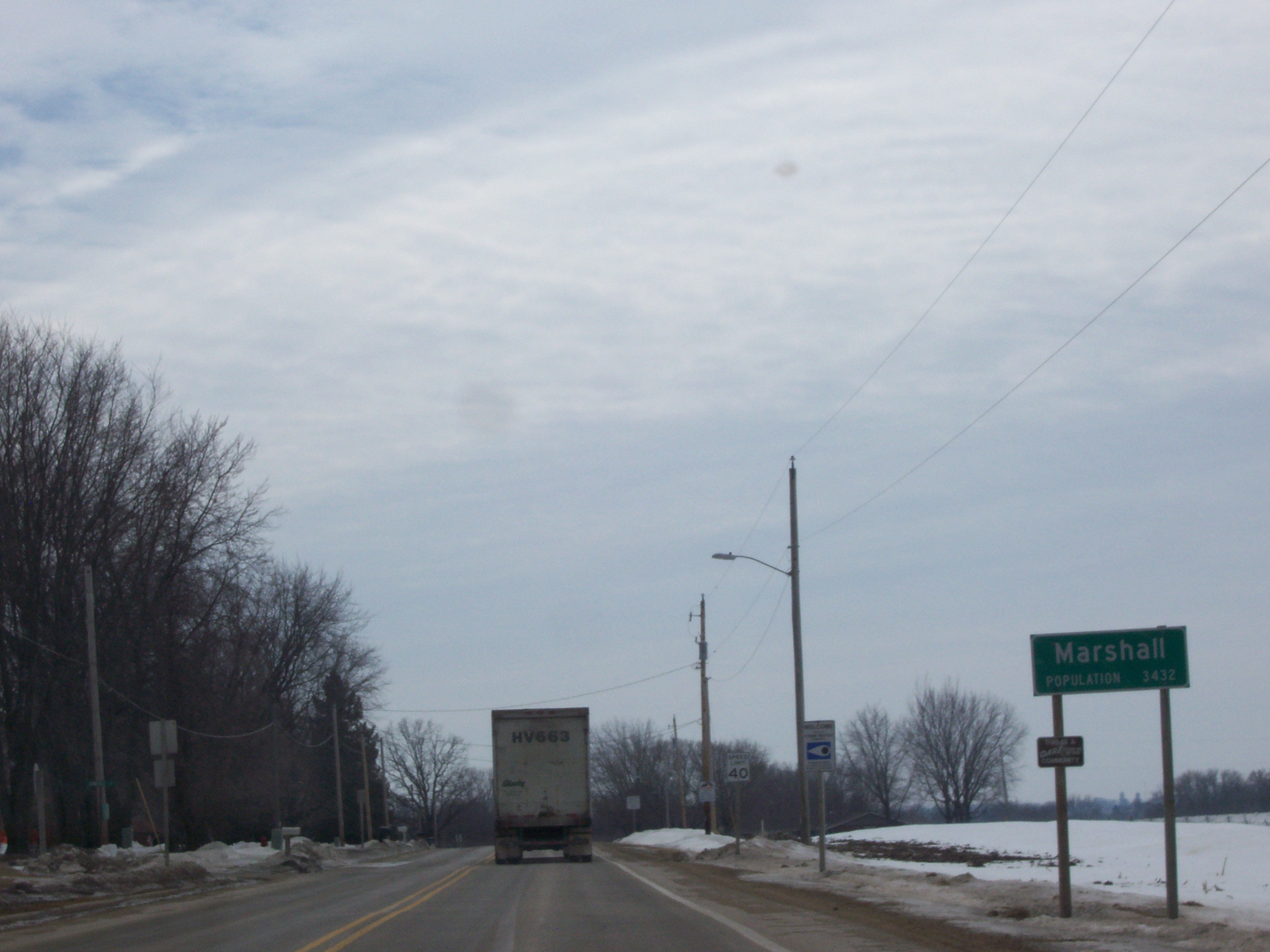
Population sign on WIS 73

In June 1837, Andrew Bird, Zenas Bird and Aaron Petrie began a settlement along the banks of the Maunesha River. In the fall of 1838, a fire destroyed the settlement. For more than a decade after that the area was known as Bird's Ruins. In 1849, Bird's Ruins became Hanchettville to recognize Asahel Hanchett for luring several needed businesses to the village. Railway officials located a depot of the new Milwaukee to Madison rail line in Hanchettville, and the village residents renamed Hanchettville to Howard City after one of the leading railway promoters. Howard City did not prosper, so Asahel Hanchett sold his land holdings to Madison real estate brokers William F. Porter and Samuel Marshall in 1860. This included the grist mill created by Ansel Hanchett in 1852 which Marshall renamed "Marshall's Roller Mill." Marshall was the original home of what became Augsburg University from its opening in September 1869 to its move to Minneapolis, Minnesota in 1872.

The settlement was then renamed after Samuel Marshall in 1861. Samuel Marshall founded Marshall & Ilsley Corporation (M&I) Bank in Madison in 1853. The Porter family moved from Madison to make their home in Marshall in 1860, and William F. Porter left in 1865 for Massachusetts, leaving his share of the property to his son William Henry Porter. Marshall was officially incorporated as a village on January 24, 1905, and had a population of 467. In 1908, the mill it was sold to the Blaschka family, and today it operates under its present name, the "Blaschka Milling Co." The mill, an important centerpiece of Marshall history, celebrated its sesquicentennial of continuous operation in 2002.

== Geography ==
Marshall is located at 43°10′16″N 89°3′53″W (43.171084, -89.064714). A significant geographical feature of Marshall is the mill pond and dam, originally created to power the feed mill, although no longer used for that purpose. This impoundment of the Maunesha River provides water sports and recreation at a variety of local parks; Riley-Deppe County Park, Fireman's Park, and Lion's Park.

== Demographics ==
Historical population
Census	Pop.	Note	%±
1880	332		—
1890	282		−15.1%
1910	459		—
1920	497		8.3%
1930	441		−11.3%
1940	447		1.4%
1950	541		21.0%
1960	736		36.0%
1970	1,043		41.7%
1980	2,363		126.6%
1990	2,329		−1.4%
2000	3,432		47.4%
2010	3,862		12.5%
2020	3,787		−1.9%
U.S. Decennial Census

=== 2010 census ===
As of the census of 2010, there were 3,862 people, 1,437 households, and 1,040 families living in the village. The population density was 1,847.8 inhabitants per square mile (713.4/km^{2}). There were 1,500 housing units at an average density of 717.7 per square mile (277.1/km^{2}). The racial makeup of the village was 91.1% White, 1.2% African American, 0.2% Native American, 0.9% Asian, 4.9% from other races, and 1.7% from two or more races. Hispanic or Latino of any race were 11.1% of the population.

There were 1,437 households, of which 41.3% had children under the age of 18 living with them, 54.6% were married couples living together, 10.9% had a female householder with no husband present, 7.0% had a male householder with no wife present, and 27.6% were non-families. 21.5% of all households were made up of individuals, and 9.3% had someone living alone who was 65 years of age or older. The average household size was 2.68 and the average family size was 3.12.

The median age in the village was 34.4 years. 29.1% of residents were under the age of 18; 7.3% were between the ages of 18 and 24; 29.6% were from 25 to 44; 23.6% were from 45 to 64; and 10.4% were 65 years of age or older. The gender makeup of the village was 51.0% male and 49.0% female.

=== 2000 census ===
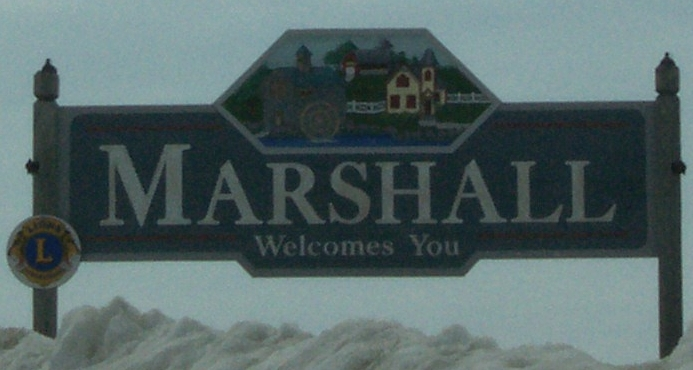
Welcome sign on WIS 73

As of the census of 2000, there were 3,432 people, 1,266 households, and 929 families living in the village. The population density was 2,018.3 people per square mile (779.5/km^{2}). There were 1,312 housing units at an average density of 771.6/sq mi (298.0/km^{2}). The racial makeup of the village was 94.52% White, 0.90% African American, 0.73% Native American, 0.17% Asian, 0.03% Pacific Islander, 2.91% from other races, and 0.73% from two or more races. Hispanic or Latino of any race were 4.02% of the population.

There were 1,266 households, out of which 42.3% had children under the age of 18 living with them, 58.1% were married couples living together, 11.3% had a female householder with no husband present, and 26.6% were non-families. 21.1% of all households were made up of individuals, and 8.1% had someone living alone who was 65 years of age or older. The average household size was 2.69 and the average family size was 3.14.

In the village, the population was spread out, with 30.7% under the age of 18, 6.6% from 18 to 24, 33.3% from 25 to 44, 18.9% from 45 to 64, and 10.4% who were 65 years of age or older. The median age was 32 years. For every 100 females, there were 99.0 males. For every 100 females age 18 and over, there were 93.0 males.

The median income for a household in the village was $46,141, and the median income for a family was $51,691. Males had a median income of $35,037 versus $24,720 for females. The per capita income for the village was $19,042. About 2.7% of families and 4.1% of the population were below the poverty line, including 3.0% of those under age 18 and 10.6% of those age 65 or over.

== Transportation ==
=== Ground transportation ===
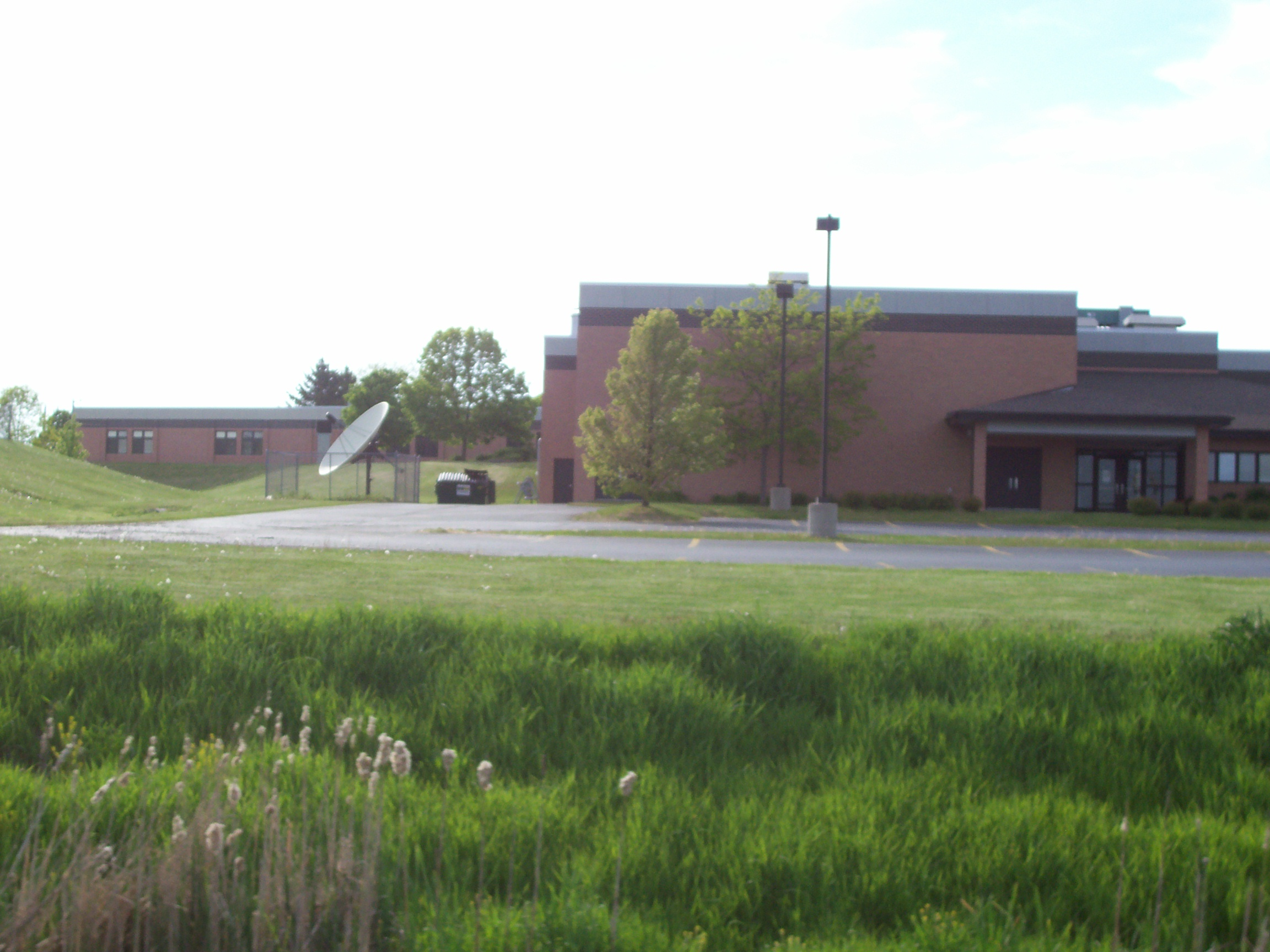
Marshall School

==== State highways ====
Wisconsin Highway 19
Wisconsin Highway 19 runs east–west from Mazomanie to Watertown Wisconsin.

Wisconsin Highway 73
Wisconsin Highway 73 runs north–south across central Wisconsin from Ingram to Edgerton.

==== Railroads ====
Marshall is located along a former Milwaukee Road line running between Milwaukee and Madison via Watertown. Passenger service was discontinued in 1957 putting all direct passenger rail travel between Milwaukee and Madison to an end. This line also has also had a Wig-Wag, located at Cherry Lane. This waning device was removed around 2015.

=== Air transportation ===
==== Airfields ====
- Mathaire Field, Marshall, Wisconsin - Privately owned and operated 2800 ft grass landing strip for single engine and ultralight vehicles.

== Notable people ==
- Craig Benzine, Internet personality
- Nathan Haseleu, NASCAR driver

== Events ==
Marshall is home to a variety of annual events. Marshall has numerous parks which makes a perfect home for these events. The historic Marshall Firemen's Park is home to these events: The Marshall Firemen's Festival, The Lions Club Ice Fisheree, and the Lions Club Steak and Lobster Feed. Marshall was also home to one of the largest disc golf tournaments in the country in 2016. Major renovations have been made over the years to the various parks. Most recently, new playground equipment was installed in Firemen's Park, upgrades were made to the ball field, and new parking lots were added.

== See also ==
- List of villages in Wisconsin
