= Hubbleton, Wisconsin =

- Unincorporated community
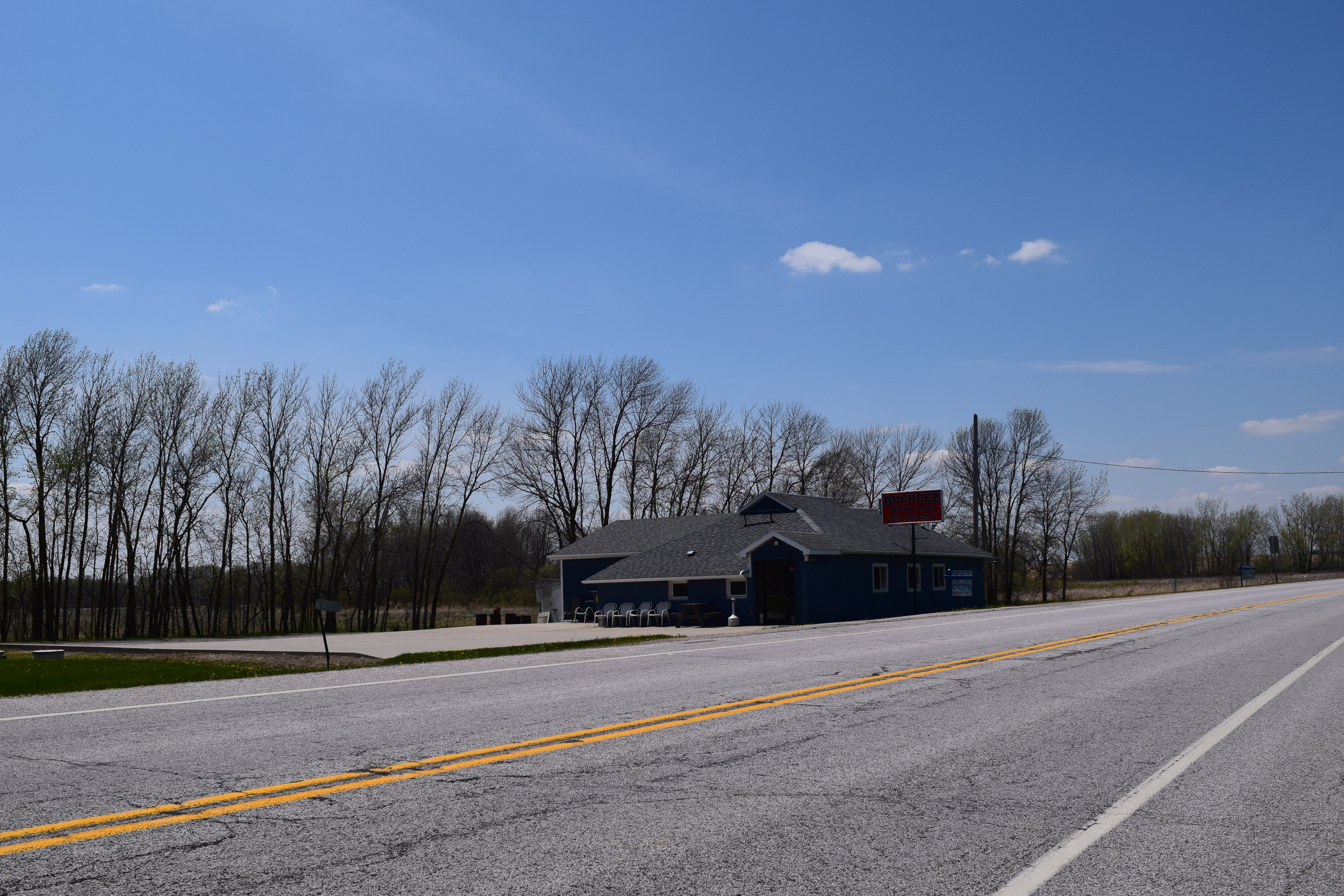
- A building in Hubbleton

- Location within Wisconsin Location within the United States
- Coordinates: 43°11′37″N 88°52′55″W
- Country: United States
- State: Wisconsin
- County: Jefferson
- Town: Milford
- Elevation: 791 ft (241 m)
- Time zone: UTC-6 (Central (CST))
  - Summer (DST): UTC-5 (CDT)
- Area code: 920
- GNIS feature ID: 1566785

Hubbleton is an unincorporated community located in the town of Milford, Jefferson County, Wisconsin, United States. The community was named for Levi Hubbell, a Wisconsin circuit court judge and politician.
