= Wales Emmons =

American politician

Wales Emmons was an American politician and a Democratic member of the Wisconsin State Assembly. Emmons represented Jefferson County, Wisconsin.
