= Crawfish River =

River in Wisconsin, United States

Coordinates: 43.00111°N 88.81261°W

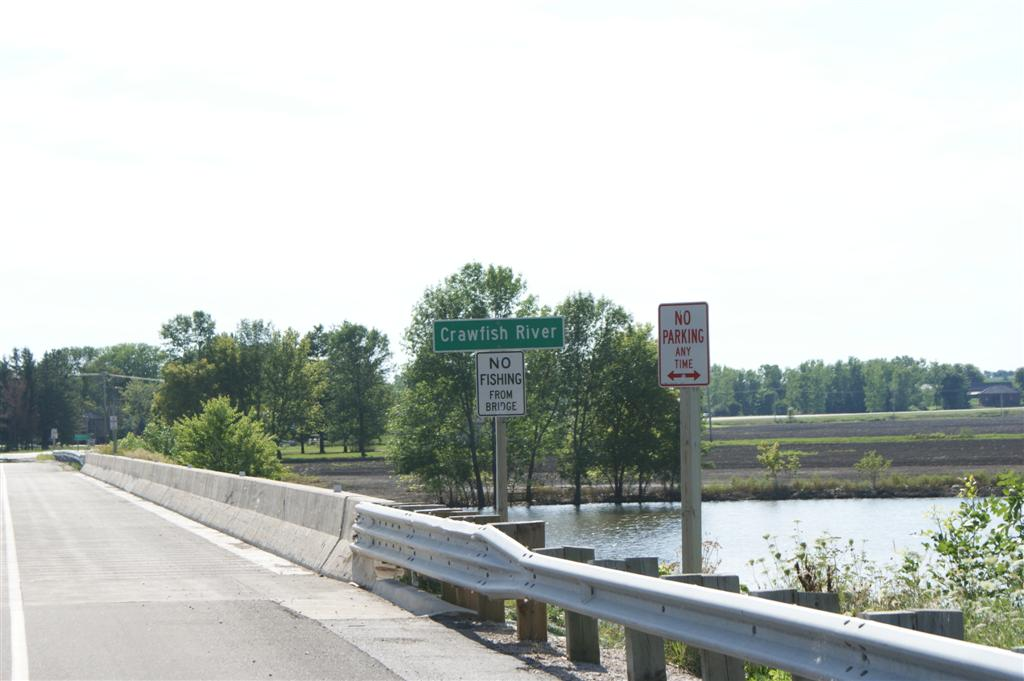
- Highway sign near Hubbleton, Wisconsin

The Crawfish River is a tributary of the Rock River, 80 miles (130 km) long, in south-central Wisconsin in the United States. Via the Rock River, it is part of the watershed of the Mississippi River.

The United States Board on Geographic Names issued a decision clarifying the name and course of the Crawfish River in 1987.

== Course ==
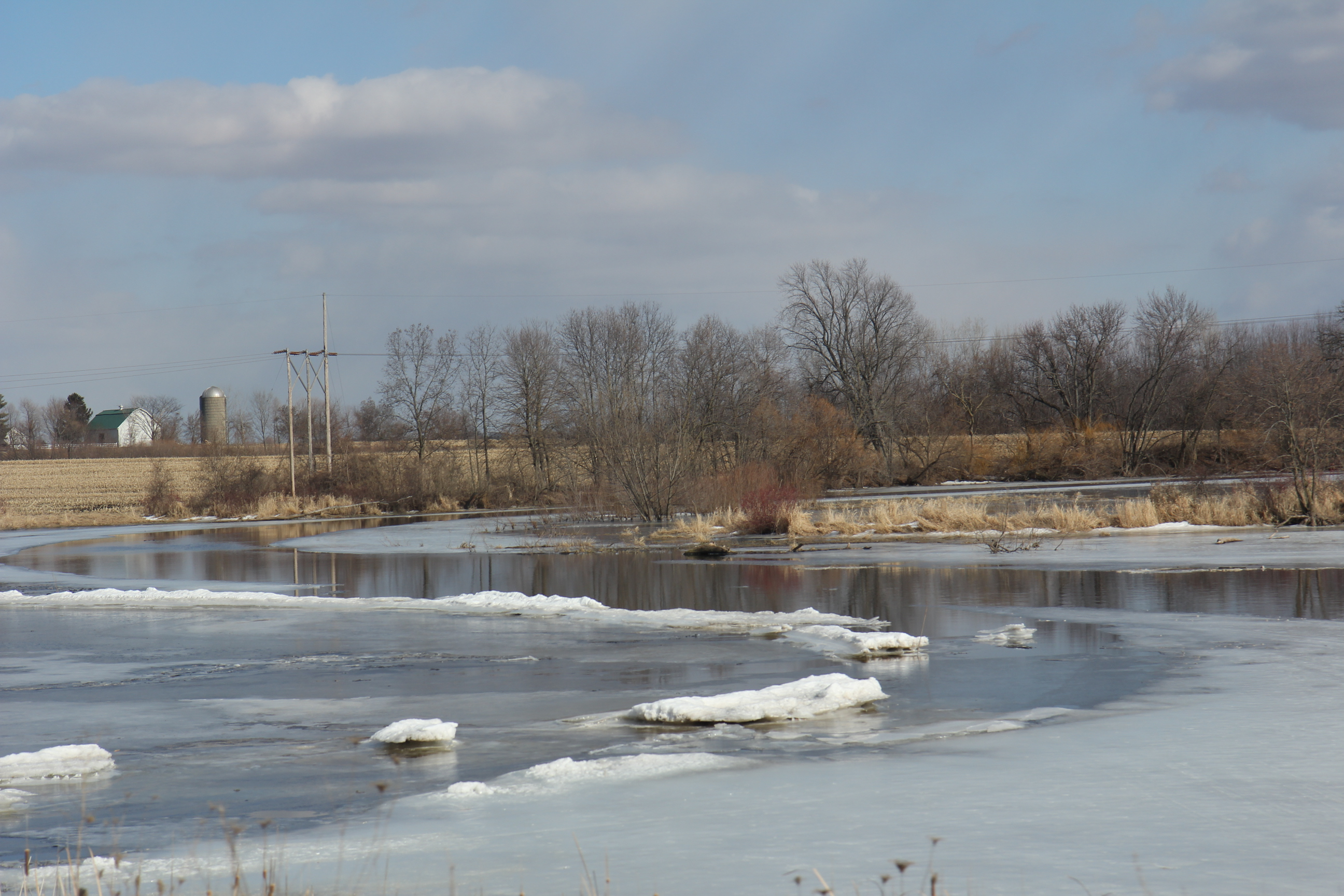
Crawfish River entering Dodge County just north of Columbus

The Crawfish River rises in Columbia County and initially flows eastward in a broadly meandering course, collecting the North Branch Crawfish River and passing the city of Columbus. In Dodge County the river turns southward and collects two tributaries, the Maunesha River and the Beaver Dam River, before entering Jefferson County, where it joins the Rock River at the city of Jefferson. Aztalan State Park is along the river in Jefferson County at the site of a 10th - 13th Century Native American settlement.

Among other tributaries, the Crawfish River collects the North Branch Crawfish River, which also rises in Columbia County and flows through the village of Fall River.

Shortly before merging the Rock and Crawfish rivers cross under Interstate 94. Both rivers flood the nearby land on an annual basis. In 2008, some lanes on I-94 were temporarily closed due to flooding from both rivers.

== See also ==
- List of Wisconsin rivers
