= History of Wisconsin =

The history of Wisconsin includes stories of the many peoples who have lived in Wisconsin, starting with the Native American tribes, the French and British colonists who were the first Europeans to live there, and the American settlers who moved to Wisconsin when it was a territory before 1848.

Since its admission to the Union on May 29, 1848, as the 30th state, Wisconsin has been ethnically heterogeneous, with Yankees being among the first to arrive from New York and New England. They dominated the state's heavy industry, finance, politics and education. Large numbers of European immigrants followed them, including German Americans, mostly between 1850 and 1900, Scandinavians (the largest group being Norwegian Americans) and smaller groups of Belgian Americans, Dutch Americans, Swiss Americans, Finnish Americans, Irish Americans and others; in the 20th century, large numbers of Polish Americans and African Americans came, settling mainly in Milwaukee, as well as Hmong Americans in Eau Claire and Appleton.

== Pre-Columbian history ==
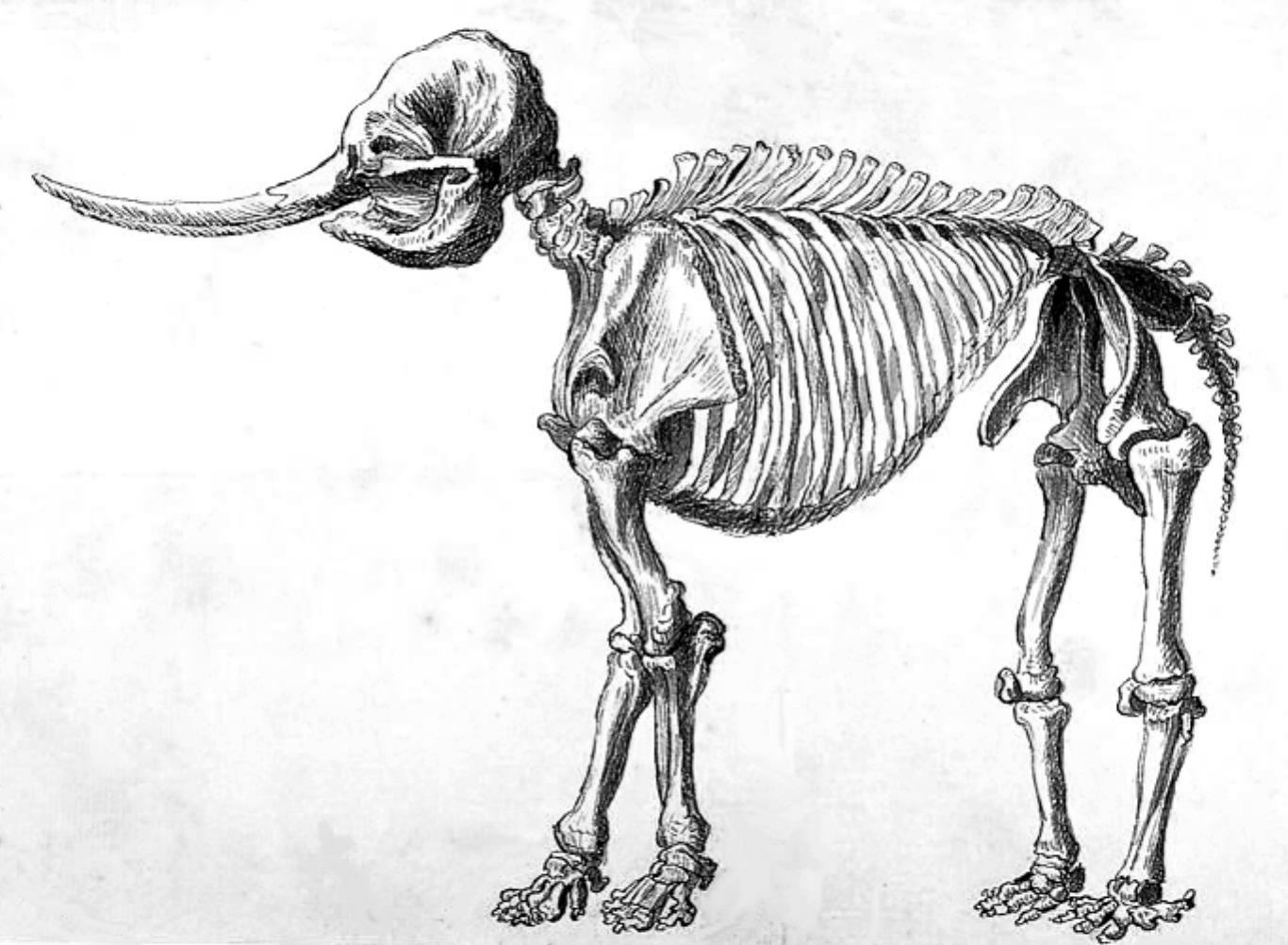
Drawing of a mastodon skeleton by Rembrandt Peale

The first known inhabitants of what is now Wisconsin were Paleo-Indians, who first arrived in the region in about 10,000 BC at the end of the Ice Age. The retreating glaciers left behind a tundra in Wisconsin inhabited by large animals, such as mammoths, mastodons, bison, giant beaver, and muskox. The Boaz mastodon and the Clovis artifacts discovered in Boaz, Wisconsin show that the Paleo-Indians hunted these large animals. They also gathered plants as conifer forests grew in the glaciers' wake. With the decline and extinction of many large mammals in the Americas, the Paleo-Indian diet shifted toward smaller mammals like deer and bison.

During the Archaic Period, from 6000 to 1000 BC, mixed conifer-hardwood forests as well as mixed prairie-forests replaced Wisconsin's conifer forests. People continued to depend on hunting and gathering. Around 4000 BC they developed spear-throwers and copper tools such as axes, adzes, projectile points, knives, perforators, fishhooks and harpoons. Copper ornaments like beaded necklaces also appeared around 1500 BC. These people gathered copper ore at quarries on the Keweenaw Peninsula in Michigan and on Isle Royale in Lake Superior. They may have crafted copper artifacts by hammering and folding the metal and also by heating it to increase its malleability. However it is not certain if these people reached the level of copper smelting. Regardless, the Copper Culture of the Great Lakes region reached a level of sophistication unprecedented in North America. The Late Archaic Period also saw the emergence of cemeteries and ritual burials, such as the one in Oconto.

The Early Woodland Period began in 1000 BC as plants became an increasingly important part of the people's diet. Small scale agriculture and pottery arrived in southern Wisconsin at this time. The primary crops were maize, beans and squash. Agriculture, however, could not sufficiently support these people, who also had to hunt and gather. Agriculture at this time was more akin to gardening than to farming. Villages emerged along rivers, streams and lakes, and the earliest earthen burial mounds were constructed.

The Havana Hopewell culture arrived in Wisconsin in the Middle Woodland Period, settling along the Mississippi River. The Hopewell people connected Wisconsin to their trade practices, which stretched from Ohio to Yellowstone and from Wisconsin to the Gulf of Mexico. They constructed elaborate mounds, made elaborately decorated pottery and brought a wide range of traded minerals to the area. The Hopewell people may have influenced the other inhabitants of Wisconsin, rather than displacing them. The Late Woodland Period began in about 400 AD, following the disappearance of the Hopewell culture from the area. The people of Wisconsin first used the bow and arrow in the final centuries of the Woodland Period, and agriculture continued to be practiced in the southern part of the state. The effigy mound culture dominated Southern Wisconsin during this time, building earthen burial mounds in the shapes of animals. Examples of effigy mounds still exist at High Cliff State Park and at Lizard Mound County Park. In northern Wisconsin people continued to survive on hunting and gathering, and constructed conical mounds.

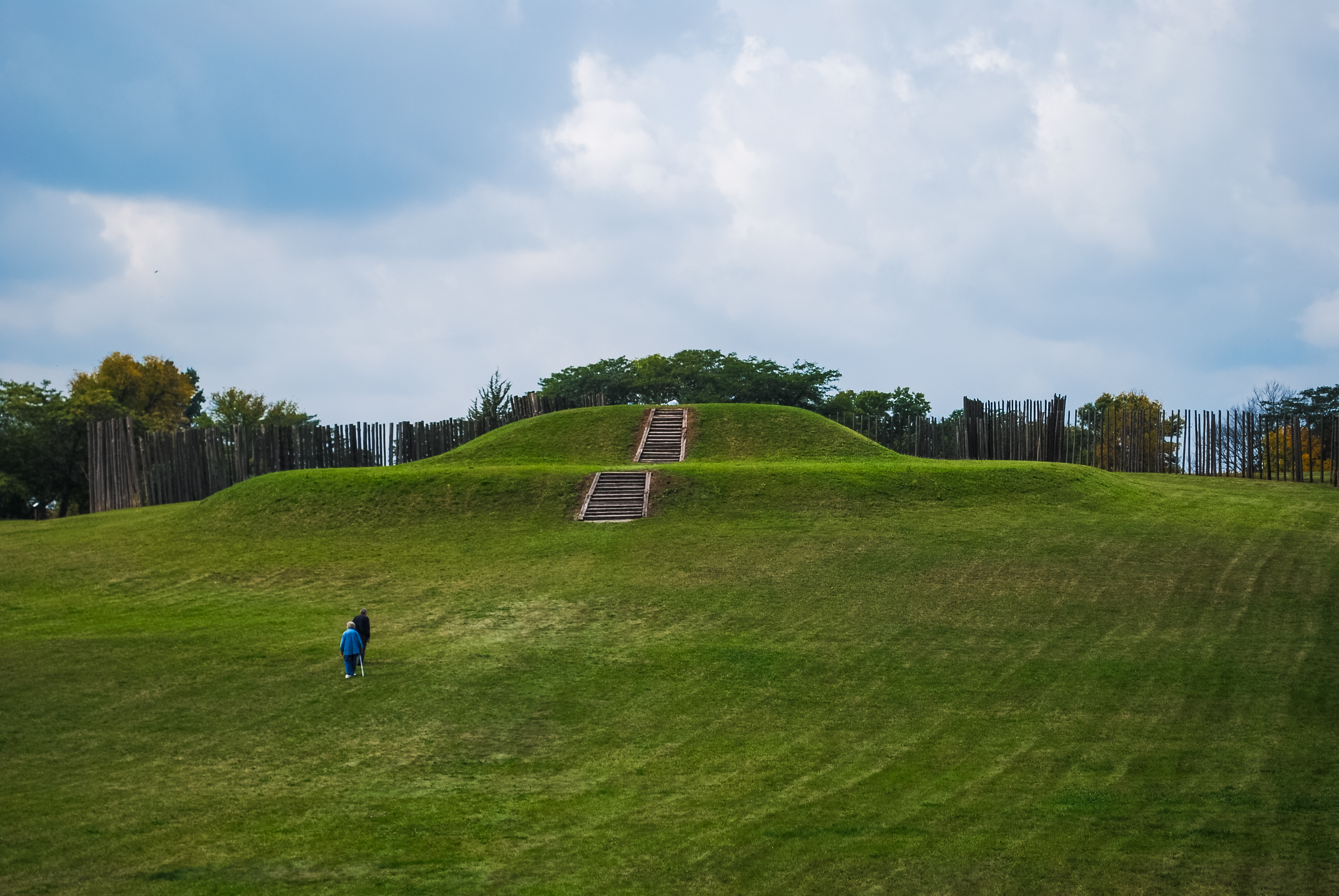
The largest platform mound at Aztalan, with modern reconstructions of steps and stockade

People of the Mississippian culture expanded into Wisconsin around 1050 AD and established a settlement at Aztalan along the Crawfish River. While begun by the Caddoan people, other cultures began to borrow & adapt the Mississippian cultural structure. This elaborately planned site may have been the northernmost outpost of Cahokia, although it is also now known that some Siouan peoples along the Mississippi River may have taken part in the culture as well.

Both Woodland and Mississippian peoples inhabited Aztalan, which was connected to the extensive Mississippian trade network. Shells from the Gulf of Mexico, copper from Lake Superior and Mill Creek chert have been found at the site. Aztalan was abandoned around 1200 AD. The Oneota people later built agriculturally based villages, similar to those of the Mississippians but without the extensive trade networks, in the state. By the time the first Europeans arrived in Wisconsin, the Oneota had disappeared.

== Exploration and colonization ==
=== French period ===
When Europeans first arrived in Wisconsin, several native groups already resided there. The Siouan speaking Dakota Oyate lived in the northwest. The Chiwere speaking Ho-Chunk (Winnebago) and the Algonquian Menominee lived in the northeast, with their lands beginning approximately north of Green Bay. The Chiwere lands were south of Green Bay and followed rivers to the southwest. Additional groups in Wisconsin included the Ojibwe, the Potawatomi, the Kickapoo, the Sauk and Meskwaki (Fox), and the Illinois. After European contact, other tribes moved to Wisconsin, including the Miami, Wyandot, Mahican, and Oneida people. with the Mahican being one of the last groups to arrive. The Ojibwe, Menominee, Ho-Chunk, and Potawatomi, Mahican, Brothertown, and Oneida remain in Wisconsin.

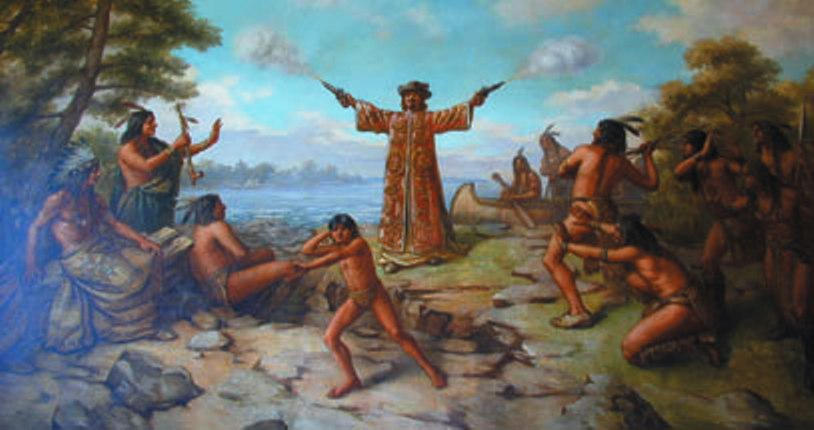
Jean Nicolet's 1634 landing in Wisconsin

The first European known to have landed in Wisconsin was Jean Nicolet. In 1634, Samuel de Champlain, governor of New France, sent Nicolet to contact the Ho-Chunk people, make peace between them and the Huron and expand the fur trade, and possibly to also find a water route to Asia. Accompanied by seven Huron guides, Nicolet left New France and canoed through Lake Huron and Lake Superior, and then became the first European known to have entered Lake Michigan. Nicolet proceeded into Green Bay, which he named La Baie des Puants (literally "The Stinking Bay"), and probably came ashore near the Red Banks. He made contact with the Ho-Chunk and Menominee living in the area and established peaceful relations. Nicolet remained with the Ho-Chunk the winter before he returned to Quebec.

The Beaver Wars fought between the Iroquois and the French prevented French explorers from returning to Wisconsin until 1652–1654, when Pierre Radisson and Médard des Groseilliers arrived at La Baie des Puants to trade furs. They returned to Wisconsin in 1659–1660, this time at Chequamegon Bay on Lake Superior. On their second voyage they found that the Ojibwe had expanded into northern Wisconsin, as they continued to prosper in the fur trade. They also were the first Europeans to contact the Santee Dakota. They built a trading post and wintered near Ashland, before returning to Montreal.

In 1665 Claude-Jean Allouez, a Jesuit missionary, built a mission on Lake Superior. Five years later he abandoned the mission, and journeyed to La Baie des Puants. Two years later he built Saint Francis Xavier Mission near present-day De Pere. In his journeys through Wisconsin, he encountered groups of Native Americans who had been displaced by Iroquois in the Beaver Wars. He evangelized the Algonquin-speaking Potawatomi, who had settled on the Door Peninsula after fleeing Iroquois attacks in Michigan. He also encountered the Algonquin-speaking Sauk, who had been forced into Michigan by the Iroquois, and then had been forced into central Wisconsin by the Ojibwe and the Huron.

The next major expedition into Wisconsin was that of Father Jacques Marquette and Louis Jolliet in 1673. After hearing rumors from Indians telling of the existence of the Mississippi River, Marquette and Joliet set out from St. Ignace, in what is now Michigan, and entered the Fox River at Green Bay. They canoed up the Fox until they reached the river's westernmost point, and then portaged, or carried their boats, to the nearby Wisconsin River, where they resumed canoeing downstream to the Mississippi River. Marquette and Joliet reached the Mississippi near what is now Prairie du Chien, Wisconsin in June, 1673.

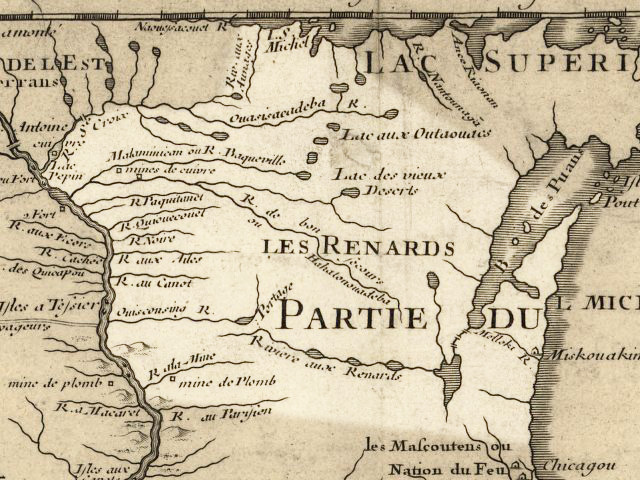
Wisconsin in 1718, Guillaume de L'Isle map, approximate state area highlighted

Nicolas Perrot, French commander of the west, established Fort St. Nicholas at Prairie du Chien, Wisconsin in May, 1685, near the southwest end of the Fox-Wisconsin Waterway. Perrot also built a fort on the shores of Lake Pepin called Fort St. Antoine in 1686, and a second fort, called Fort Perrot, on an island on Lake Pepin shortly after. In 1727, Fort Beauharnois was constructed on what is now the Minnesota side of Lake Pepin to replace the two previous forts. A fort and a Jesuit mission were also built on the shores of Lake Superior at La Pointe, in present-day Wisconsin, in 1693 and operated until 1698. A second fort was built on the same site in 1718 and operated until 1759. These were not military posts, but rather small storehouses for furs.

During the French colonial period, the first black people came to Wisconsin. The first record of a black person comes from 1725, when a black slave was killed along with four Frenchmen in a Native American raid on Green Bay. Other French fur traders and military personnel brought slaves with them to Wisconsin later in 1700s.

None of the French posts had permanent settlers; fur traders and missionaries simply visited them from time to time to conduct business.

==== Second Fox War ====
In the 1720s, the anti-French Meskwaki, led by war chief Kiala, raided French settlements on the Mississippi River and disrupted French trade on Lake Michigan. From 1728 to 1733, the Meskwaki fought against the French-supported Potawatomi, Ojibwe, Wyandot and Odawa tribes. In 1733, Kiala was captured and sold into slavery in the West Indies along with other captured Meskwaki.

Before the war, the Meskwaki numbered 1,500, but by 1733, only 500 were left. As a result, the Meskwaki joined the Sauk.

The details are unclear, but this war appears to have been part of the conflict that expelled the Dakota and Illinois peoples out onto the Great Plains, causing further displacement of other Chiwere, Caddoan and Algonquian peoples there—including the ancestors of the Ioway, Osage, Pawnee, Arikara, A'ani, Arapaho, Hidatsa, Cheyenne and Blackfoot.

=== British period ===
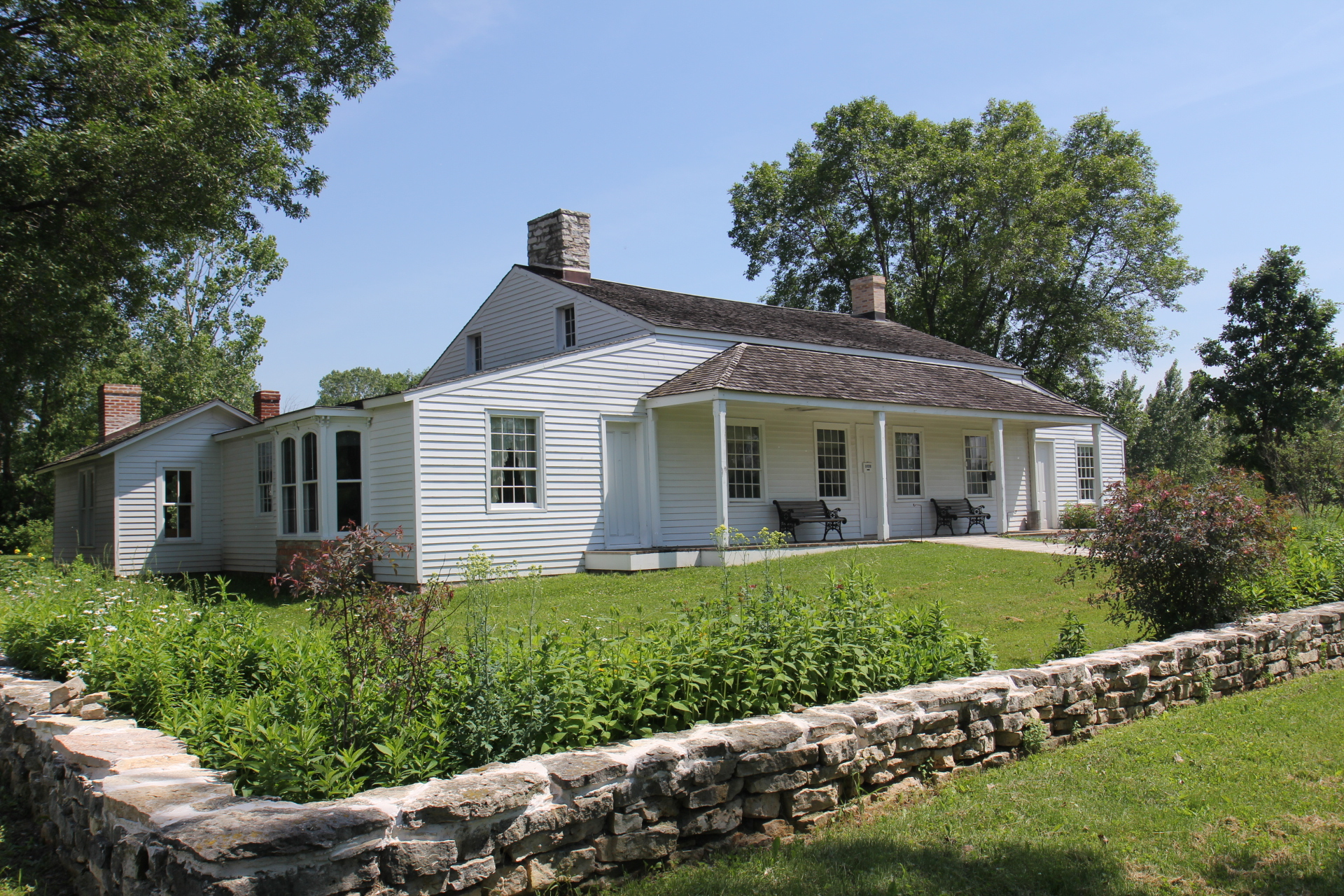
French-Canadian voyageur Joseph Roi built the Tank Cottage in Green Bay in 1776. Located in Heritage Hill State Historical Park, it is the oldest standing building from Wisconsin's early years and is listed on the National Register of Historic Places.

The British gradually took over Wisconsin during the French and Indian War, taking control of Green Bay in 1761, gaining control of all of Wisconsin in 1763, and annexing the area to the Province of Quebec in 1774. Like the French, the British were interested in little but the fur trade. One notable event in the fur trading industry in Wisconsin occurred in 1791, when two free African Americans set up a fur trading post among the Menominee at present day Marinette. The first permanent settlers, mostly French Canadians, some Anglo-New Englanders and a few African American freedmen, arrived in Wisconsin while it was under British control. Charles Michel de Langlade is generally recognized as the first settler, establishing a trading post at Green Bay in 1745, and moving there permanently in 1764. In 1766 the Royal Governor of the new territory, Robert Rogers, engaged Jonathan Carver to explore and map the newly acquired territories for the Crown, and to search for a possible Northwest Passage. Carver left Fort Michilimackinac that spring and spent the next three years exploring and mapping what is now Wisconsin and parts of Minnesota.

Settlement began at Prairie du Chien around 1781. The French residents at the trading post in what is now Green Bay, referred to the town as "La Bey", however British fur traders referred to it as "Green Bay", because the water and the shore assumed green tints in early spring. The old French title was gradually dropped, and the British name of "Green Bay" eventually stuck. The region coming under British rule had virtually no adverse effect on the French residents as the British needed the cooperation of the French fur traders and the French fur traders needed the goodwill of the British. During the French occupation of the region licenses for fur trading had been issued scarcely and only to select groups of traders, whereas the British, in an effort to make as much money as possible from the region, issued licenses for fur trading freely, both to British and French residents. The fur trade in what is now Wisconsin reached its height under British rule, and the first self-sustaining farms in the state were established at this time as well. From 1763 to 1780, Green Bay was a prosperous community which produced its own foodstuff, built graceful cottages and held dances and festivities.

== Territorial period ==
The United States acquired Wisconsin in the Treaty of Paris (1783). Massachusetts claimed the territory east of the Mississippi River between the present-day Wisconsin-Illinois border and present-day La Crosse, Wisconsin. Virginia claimed the territory north of La Crosse to Lake Superior and all of present-day Minnesota east of the Mississippi River. Shortly afterward, in 1787, the Americans made Wisconsin part of the new Northwest Territory. Later, in 1800, Wisconsin became part of Indiana Territory. Despite the fact that Wisconsin belonged to the United States at this time, the British continued to control the local fur trade and maintain military alliances with Wisconsin Indians in an effort to stall American expansion westward by creating a pro-British Indian barrier state.

=== War of 1812 and the Indian wars ===
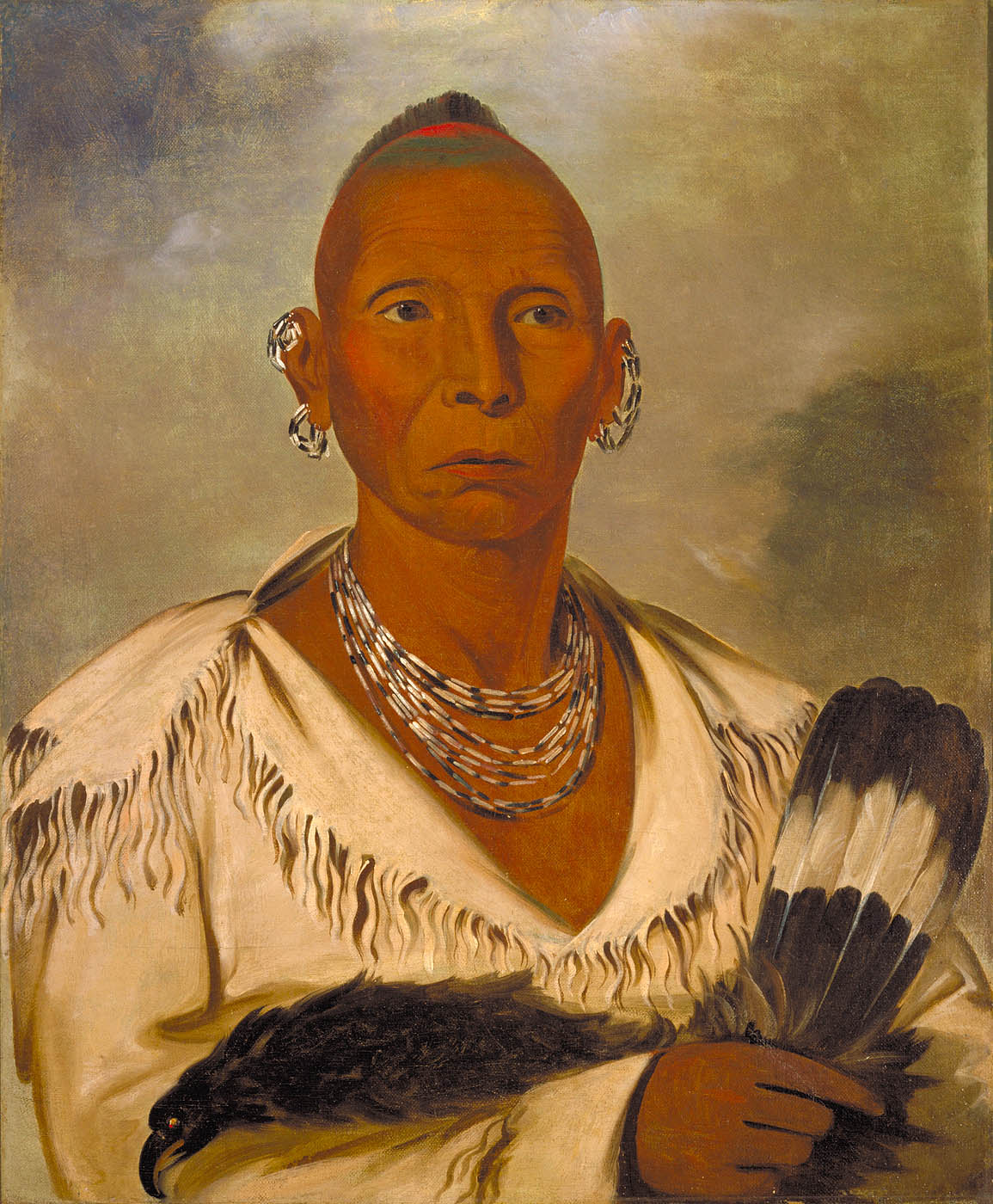
Chief Black Hawk, by George Catlin

The United States did not firmly exercise control over Wisconsin until the War of 1812. In 1814, the Americans built Fort Shelby at Prairie du Chien. During the war, the Americans and British fought one battle in Wisconsin, the July, 1814 Siege of Prairie du Chien, which ended as a British victory. The British captured Fort Shelby and renamed it Fort McKay, after Major William McKay, the British commander who led the forces that won the Battle of Prairie du Chien. However, the 1815 Treaty of Ghent reaffirmed American jurisdiction over Wisconsin, which was by then a part of Illinois Territory. Following the treaty, British troops burned Fort McKay, rather than giving it back to the Americans, and departed Wisconsin. To protect Prairie du Chien from future attacks, the United States Army constructed Fort Crawford in 1816, on the same site as Fort Shelby. Fort Howard was also built in 1816 in Green Bay.

Significant American settlement in Wisconsin, a part of Michigan Territory beginning in 1818, was delayed by two Indian wars, the minor Winnebago War of 1827 and the larger Black Hawk War of 1832.

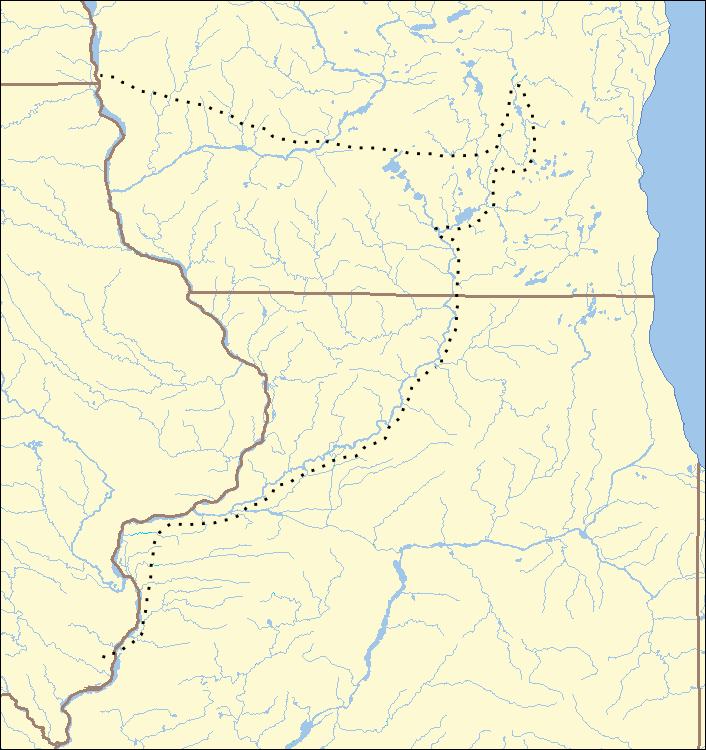
Map of Black Hawk War sites
Battle (with name) Fort / settlement Native village
Symbols are wikilinked to article

==== Winnebago War ====
The Winnebago War started when, in 1826, two Winnebago men were detained at Fort Crawford on charges of murder and then transferred to Fort Snelling in present-day Minnesota. The Winnebago in the area believed that both men had been executed. On June 27, 1827, a Winnebago war band led by Chief Red Bird and the prophet White Cloud (Wabokieshiek) attacked a family of settlers outside of Prairie du Chien, killing two. They then went on to attack two keel-boats on the Mississippi River that were heading toward Fort Snelling, killing two settlers and injuring four more. Seven Winnebago warriors were killed in those attacks. The war band also attacked settlers on the lower Wisconsin River and the lead mines at Galena, Illinois. The war band surrendered at Portage, Wisconsin, rather than fighting the United States Army that was pursuing them.

==== Black Hawk War ====
In the Black Hawk War, Sauk, Meskwaki, and Kickapoo people, led by Black Hawk, who had been relocated from Illinois to Iowa, attempted to resettle in their Illinois homeland on April 5, 1832. On May 10 Black Hawk decided to go back to Iowa. On May 14, Black Hawk's forces met with a group of militiamen led by Isaiah Stillman. All three members of Black Hawk's parley were shot and one was killed. The Battle of Stillman's Run ensued, leaving twelve militiamen and three to five Sauk and Meskwaki warriors dead. Of the fifteen battles of the war, six took place in Wisconsin. The other nine as well as several smaller skirmishes took place in Illinois. The first confrontation to take place in Wisconsin was the first attack on Fort Blue Mounds on June 6, in which one member of the local militia was killed outside of the fort. There was also the Spafford Farm Massacre on June 14, the Battle of Horseshoe Bend on June 16, which was a United States victory, the second attack on Fort Blue Mounds on June 20, and the Sinsinawa Mound raid on June 29. The Native Americans were defeated at the Battle of Wisconsin Heights on July 21, with forty to seventy killed and only one killed on the United States side. The Black Hawk War ended with the Bad Axe massacre on August 1–2, with over 150 Native Americans dead and 75 captured and only five killed in the United States forces. Many of the Native American warchiefs were handed over to the United States on August 20, with the exception of Black Hawk and White Cloud, who surrendered on August 27, 1832. Black Hawk moved back to Iowa in 1833, after being held prisoner by the United States government.

=== Territorial settlement ===
The state seal of Wisconsin contains a shovel and pickaxe, reflecting the importance of lead mining to Wisconsin's history.

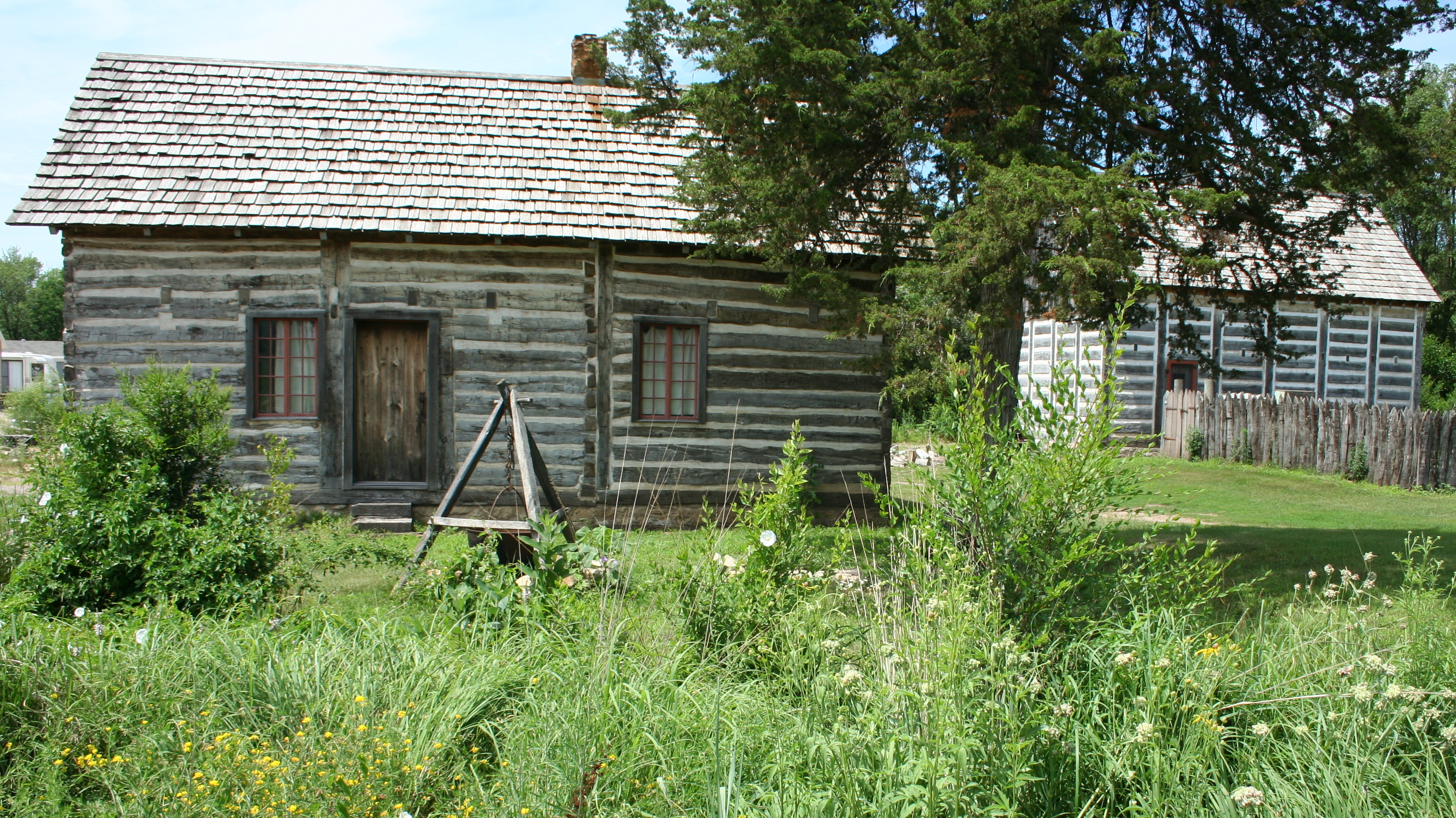
The Francois Vertefeuille House in Prairie du Chien was built in the 1810s by fur traders. A rare example of the pièce-sur-pièce à coulisse technique once common in French-Canadian architecture, it is one of the oldest buildings in the state and is listed on the National Register of Historic Places.

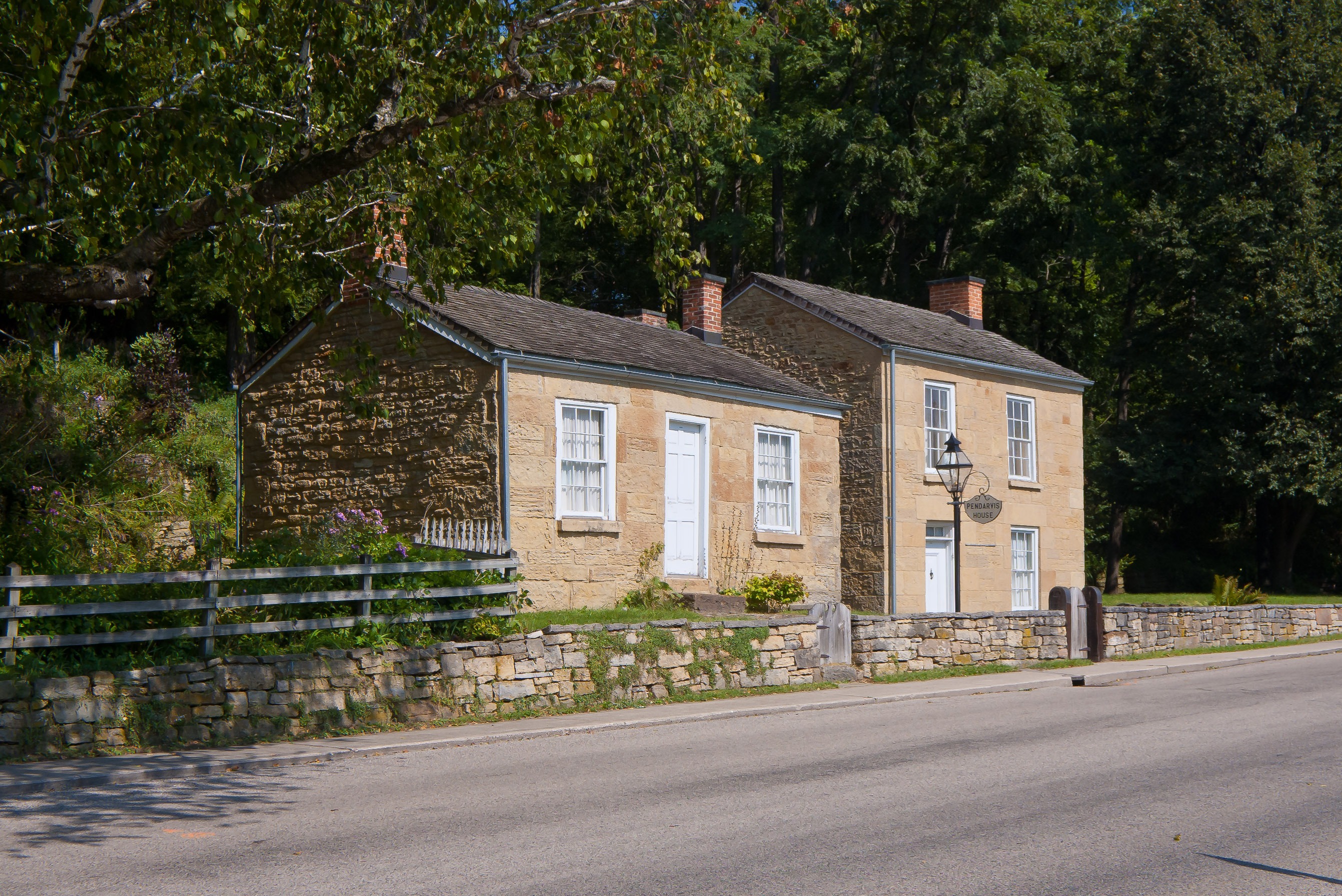
The Cornish immigrants who worked in Wisconsin's lead mines build simple stone cabins from limestone. Six cabins are preserved at the Pendarvis Historic Site in Mineral Point.

The resolution of these Indian conflicts opened the way for Wisconsin's settlement. Many of the region's first settlers were drawn by the prospect of lead mining in southwest Wisconsin. This area had traditionally been mined by Native Americans. However, after a series of treaties removed the Indians, the lead mining region was opened to white miners. Thousands rushed in from across the country to dig for the "gray gold". By 1829, 4,253 miners and 52 licensed smelting works were in the region. Expert miners from Cornwall in Britain informed a large part of the wave of immigrants. Boom towns like Mineral Point, Platteville, Shullsburg, Belmont, and New Diggings sprang up around mines. The first two federal land offices in Wisconsin were opened in 1834 at Green Bay and at Mineral Point. By the 1840s, southwest Wisconsin mines were producing more than half of the nation's lead, which was no small amount, as the United States was producing annually some 31 million pounds of lead. Wisconsin was dubbed the "Badger State" because of the lead miners who first settled there in the 1820s and 1830s. Without shelter in the winter, they had to "live like badgers" in tunnels burrowed into hillsides.

Although the lead mining area drew the first major wave of settlers, its population would soon be eclipsed by growth in Milwaukee. Milwaukee, along with Sheboygan, Manitowoc, and Kewaunee, can be traced back to a series of trading posts established by the French trader Jacques Vieau in 1795. Vieau's post at the mouth of the Milwaukee River was purchased in 1820 by Solomon Juneau, who had visited the area as early as 1818. Juneau moved to what is now Milwaukee and took over the trading post's operation in 1825.

When the fur trade began to decline, Juneau focused on developing the land around his trading post. In the 1830s, he formed a partnership with Green Bay lawyer Morgan Martin, and the two men bought 160 acres (0.6 km^{2}) of land between Lake Michigan and the Milwaukee River. There they founded the settlement of Juneautown. Meanwhile, an Ohio businessman named Byron Kilbourn began to invest in the land west of the Milwaukee River, forming the settlement of Kilbourntown. South of these two settlements, George H. Walker founded the town of Walker's Point in 1835. Each of these three settlements engaged in a fierce competition to attract the most residents and become the largest of the three towns. In 1840, the Wisconsin State Legislature ordered the construction of a bridge over the Milwaukee River to replace the inadequate ferry system. In 1845, Byron Kilbourn, who had been trying to isolate Juneautown to make it more dependent on Kilbourntown, destroyed a portion of the bridge, which started the Milwaukee Bridge War. For several weeks, skirmishes broke out between the residents of both towns. No one was killed but several people were injured, some seriously. On January 31, 1846, the settlements of Juneautown, Kilbourntown, and Walker's Point merged into the incorporated city of Milwaukee. Solomon Juneau was elected mayor. The new city had a population of about 10,000 people, making it the largest city in the territory. Milwaukee remains the largest city in Wisconsin to this day.

=== Wisconsin Territory ===
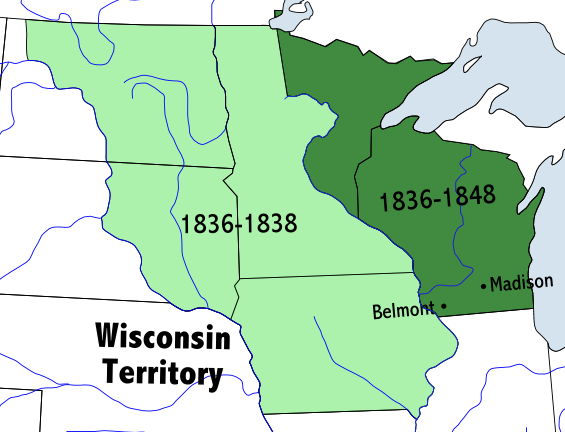
Map of Wisconsin Territory 1836–1848

The Wisconsin Territory was created by an act of the United States Congress on April 20, 1836. By fall of that year, the best prairie groves of the counties surrounding Milwaukee were occupied by New England farmers. The new territory initially included all of the present day states of Wisconsin, Minnesota, and Iowa, as well as parts of North and South Dakota. At the time the Congress called it the "Wiskonsin Territory".

The first territorial governor of Wisconsin was Henry Dodge. He and other territorial lawmakers were initially busied by organizing the territory's government and selecting a capital city. The selection of a location to build a capitol caused a heated debate among the territorial politicians. At first, Governor Dodge selected Belmont, located in the heavily populated lead mining district, to be capital. Shortly after the new legislature convened there, however, it became obvious that Wisconsin's first capitol was inadequate. Numerous other suggestions for the location of the capital were given representing nearly every city that existed in the territory at the time, and Governor Dodge left the decision up to the other lawmakers. The legislature accepted a proposal by James Duane Doty to build a new city named Madison on an isthmus between lakes Mendota and Monona and put the territory's permanent capital there. In 1837, while Madison was being built, the capitol was temporarily moved to Burlington. This city was transferred to Iowa Territory in 1838, along with all the lands of Wisconsin Territory west of the Mississippi River.

=== Democracy on the Wisconsin frontier ===
Wyman calls Wisconsin a "palimpsest" of layer upon layer of peoples and forces, each imprinting permanent influences. He identified these layers as multiple "frontiers" over three centuries: Native American frontier, French frontier, English frontier, fur-trade frontier, mining frontier, and the logging frontier. Finally the coming of the railroad brought the end of the frontier.

The historian of the frontier, Frederick Jackson Turner, grew up in Wisconsin during its last frontier stage, and in his travels around the state he could see the layers of social and political development. One of Turner's last students, Merle Curti, used in-depth analysis of local history in Trempealeau County to test Turner's thesis about democracy. Turner's view was that American democracy, "involved widespread participation in the making of decisions affecting the common life, the development of initiative and self-reliance, and equality of economic and cultural opportunity. It thus also involved Americanization of immigrant." Curti found that from 1840 to 1860 in Wisconsin the poorest groups gained rapidly in land ownership, and often rose to political leadership at the local level. He found that even landless young farm workers were soon able to obtain their own farms. Free land on the frontier therefore created opportunity and democracy, for both European immigrants as well as old stock Yankees.

== Statehood ==
By the mid-1840s, the population of Wisconsin Territory had exceeded 150,000, more than twice the number of people required for Wisconsin to become a state. In 1846, the territorial legislature voted to apply for statehood. That fall, 124 delegates debated the state constitution. The document produced by this convention was considered extremely progressive for its time. It banned commercial banking, granted married women the right to own property, and left the question of African-American suffrage to a popular vote. Most Wisconsinites considered the first constitution to be too radical, however, and voted it down in an April 1847 referendum.

In December 1847, a second constitutional convention was called. This convention resulted in a new, more moderate state constitution that Wisconsinites approved in a March 1848 referendum, enabling Wisconsin to become the 30th state on May 29, 1848. Wisconsin was the last state entirely east of the Mississippi River (and by extension the last state formed entirely from territory assigned to the U.S. in the 1783 Treaty of Paris) to be admitted to the Union.

With statehood, came the creation of the University of Wisconsin–Madison the following year, which is the state's oldest public university. The creation of this university was set aside in the state charter.

=== Early state economy ===
In 1847, the Mineral Point Tribune reported that the town's furnaces were producing 43,800 pounds (19,900 kg) of lead each day. Lead mining in southwest Wisconsin began to decline after 1848 and 1849 when the combination of less easily accessible lead ore and the California Gold Rush made miners leave the area. The lead mining industry in mining communities such as Mineral Point managed to survive into the 1860s, but the industry was never as prosperous as it was before the decline.

By 1850 Wisconsin's population was 305,000. Roughly a third (103,000) were Yankees from New England and western New York state. The second largest group were the Germans, numbering roughly 38,000, followed by 28,000 British immigrants from England, Scotland and Wales. There were roughly 63,000 Wisconsin-born residents of the state. The Yankee migrants would be the dominant political class in Wisconsin for many years.

A railroad frenzy swept Wisconsin shortly after it achieved statehood. The first railroad line in the state was opened between Milwaukee and Waukesha in 1851 by the Chicago, Milwaukee, St. Paul and Pacific Railroad. The railroad pushed on, reaching Milton, Wisconsin in 1852, Stoughton, Wisconsin in 1853, and the capital city of Madison in 1854. The company reached its goal of completing a rail line across the state from Lake Michigan to the Mississippi River when the line to Prairie du Chien was completed in 1857. Shortly after this, other railroad companies completed their own tracks, reaching La Crosse in the west and Superior in the north, spurring development in those cities. By the end of the 1850s, railroads crisscrossed the state, enabling the growth of other industries that could now easily ship products to markets across the country.

=== Early state politics ===
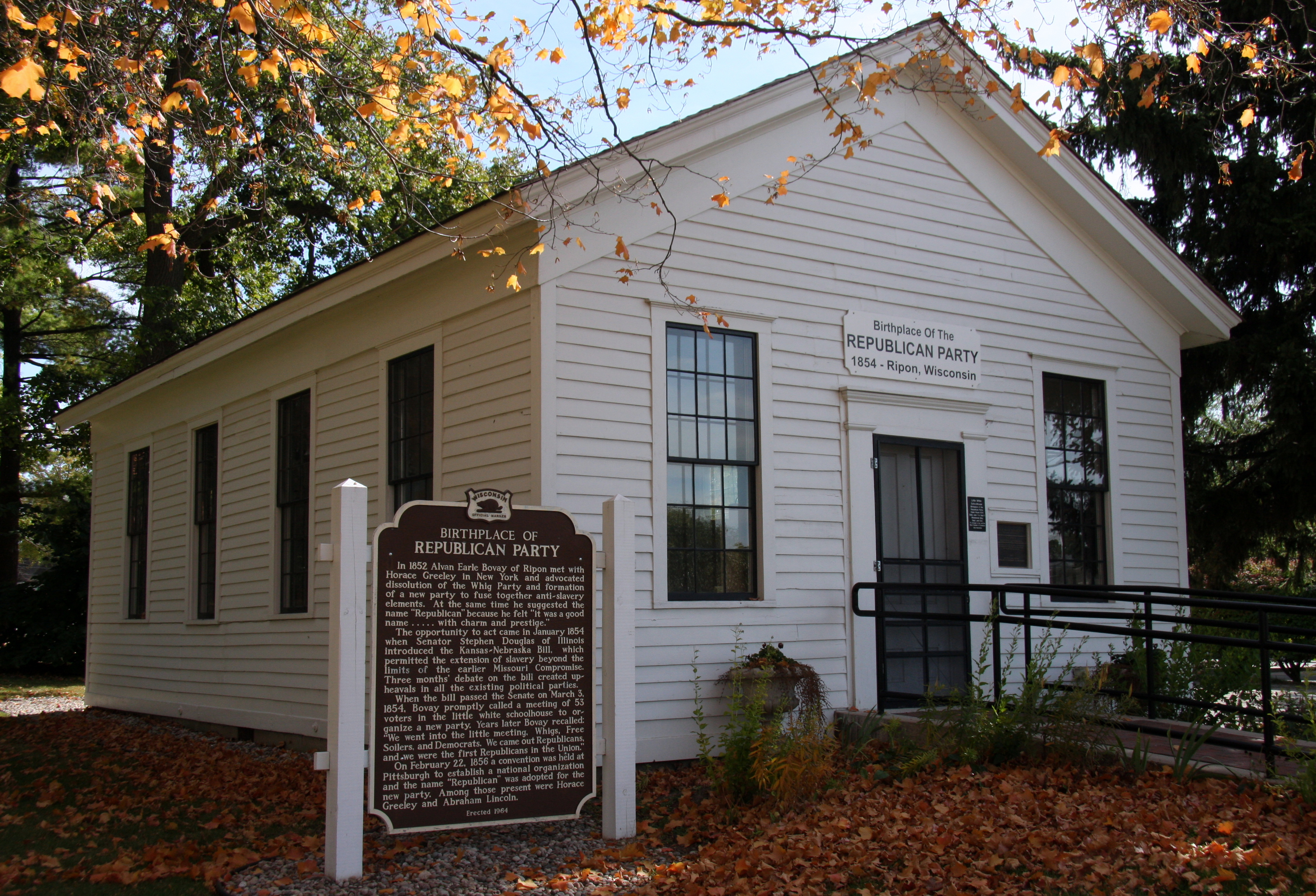
The Little White Schoolhouse, in Ripon, 1854, which hosted the first meeting of what became the national Republican Party

Nelson Dewey, the first governor of Wisconsin, was a Democrat. Born in Lebanon, Connecticut, Dewey's father's family had lived in New England since 1633, when their ancestor, Thomas Due, had come to America from Kent County, England. Dewey oversaw the transition from the territorial to the new state government. He encouraged the development of the state's infrastructure, particularly the construction of new roads, railroads, canals, and harbors, as well as the improvement of the Fox and Wisconsin Rivers. During his administration, the State Board of Public Works was organized. Dewey was an abolitionist and the first of many Wisconsin governors to advocate against the spread of slavery into new states and territories. The home Dewey built near Cassville is now a state park.

Between 1848 and 1862, Wisconsin had three Democratic governors, all of whom were in office prior to 1856, four Republican governors, all of whom were in office after 1856, and one Whig governor, Leonard J. Farwell, who served from 1852 to 1854. Under Farwell's governorship, Wisconsin became the second state to abolish capital punishment, doing so in 1853.

In the presidential elections of 1848 and 1852, the Democratic Party won Wisconsin. In the elections of 1856, 1860, and 1864, the Republican Party won the state.

==== New parties ====
Between the 1840s and 1860s, settlers from New England, New York and Germany arrived in Wisconsin. Some of them brought radical political ideas to the state. In the 1850s, stop-overs on the underground railroad were set up in the state and abolitionist groups were formed. Some abolitionist and free-soil activists left the Whig and Democratic parties, running and in some cases being elected as candidates of the Liberty Party and Free Soil Party. The most successful such group was the Republican Party. On March 20, 1854, the first county meeting of the Republican Party of the United States, consisting of about thirty people, was held in the Little White Schoolhouse in Ripon, Wisconsin. Ripon claims to be the birthplace of the Republican Party, as does Jackson, Michigan, where the first statewide convention was held. The new party absorbed most of the former Free Soil and Liberty Party members.

=== Abolitionism ===
A notable instance of abolitionism in Wisconsin was the rescue of Joshua Glover, an escaped slave from St. Louis who sought refuge in Racine, Wisconsin in 1852. He was caught in 1854 by federal marshals and put in a jail at Cathedral Square in Milwaukee, where he waited to be returned to his owner. A mob of 5,000 people led by Milwaukee abolitionist Sherman Booth, himself a "Yankee" transplant from rural New York, sprung Glover from jail and helped him escape to Canada via the underground railroad.

=== Immigration ===
In the 1850s, two-thirds of immigrants to Wisconsin came from the eastern United States, the other one-third being foreign-born. The majority of the foreign born were German immigrants. Many Irish and Norwegian immigrants also came to Wisconsin in the 1850s. Northern Europeans, many of whom were persecuted in their home countries because of their support for the failed bourgeois Revolutions of 1848, often chose Wisconsin because of the liberal constitution of human rights such as the state's unusual recognition of immigrants' right to vote and rights to citizenship.

=== Yankees and ethnocultural politics ===
Yankee settlers from New England started arriving in Wisconsin in the 1830s spread throughout the southern half of the territory. They dominated early politics. Most of them started as farmers, but the larger proportion moved to towns and cities as entrepreneurs, businessmen and professionals.

Historian John Bunker has examined the worldview of the Yankee settlers in the Wisconsin:

Because they arrived first and had a strong sense of community and mission, Yankees were able to transplant New England institutions, values, and mores, altered only by the conditions of frontier life. They established a public culture that emphasized the work ethic, the sanctity of private property, individual responsibility, faith in residential and social mobility, practicality, piety, public order and decorum, reverence for public education, activists, honest, and frugal government, town meeting democracy, and he believed that there was a public interest that transcends particular and stick ambitions. Regarding themselves as the elect and just in a world rife with sin, air, and corruption, they felt a strong moral obligation to define and enforce standards of community and personal behavior....This pietistic worldview was substantially shared by British, Scandinavian, Swiss, English-Canadian and Dutch Reformed immigrants, as well as by German Protestants and many of the "Forty-Niners."

== Civil War and Gilded Age ==
=== Civil War ===
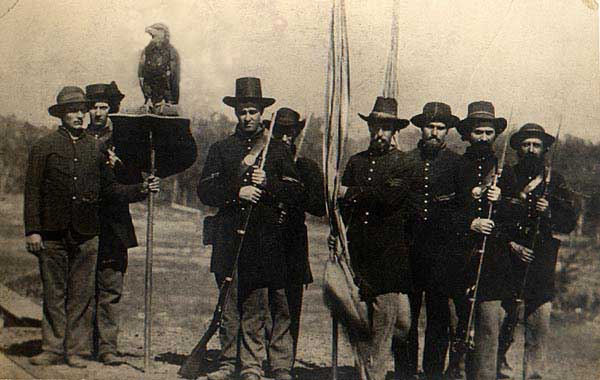
The color guard of the Wisconsin 8th Infantry with Old Abe

Wisconsin enrolled 91,379 soldiers in the Union Army during the American Civil War. 272 of enlisted Wisconsin troops were African American, with the rest being white. Of these, 3,794 were killed in action or mortally wounded, 8,022 died of disease, and 400 were killed in accidents. The total mortality was 12,216 men, about 13.4 percent of total enlistments. Many soldiers trained at Camp Randall currently the site of the University of Wisconsin's athletic stadium.

The draft implemented by President Lincoln in 1862 was unpopular in some Wisconsin communities, particularly among German and Luxembourgish immigrants. In November 1862, draft riots broke out in Milwaukee, Port Washington, and West Bend, which were quelled by deploying U.S. troops in the cities.

Most Wisconsin troops served in the western theater, although several Wisconsin regiments fought in the east, such as the 2nd Wisconsin Volunteer Infantry Regiment, 6th Wisconsin Volunteer Infantry Regiment, and 7th Wisconsin Volunteer Infantry Regiment, which formed part of the Iron Brigade. These three regiments fought in the Northern Virginia Campaign, the Maryland Campaign, the Battle of Fredericksburg, the Battle of Chancellorsville, the Gettysburg campaign, the Battle of Mine Run, the Overland Campaign, the Siege of Petersburg, and the Appomattox Campaign.

The 8th Wisconsin Volunteer Infantry Regiment, which fought in the western theater of war, is also worthy of mention, having fought at the Battle of Iuka, the Siege of Vicksburg, the Red River Campaign, and the Battle of Nashville. The 8th Wisconsin is also known for its mascot, a bald eagle named Old Abe.

=== Economic growth ===
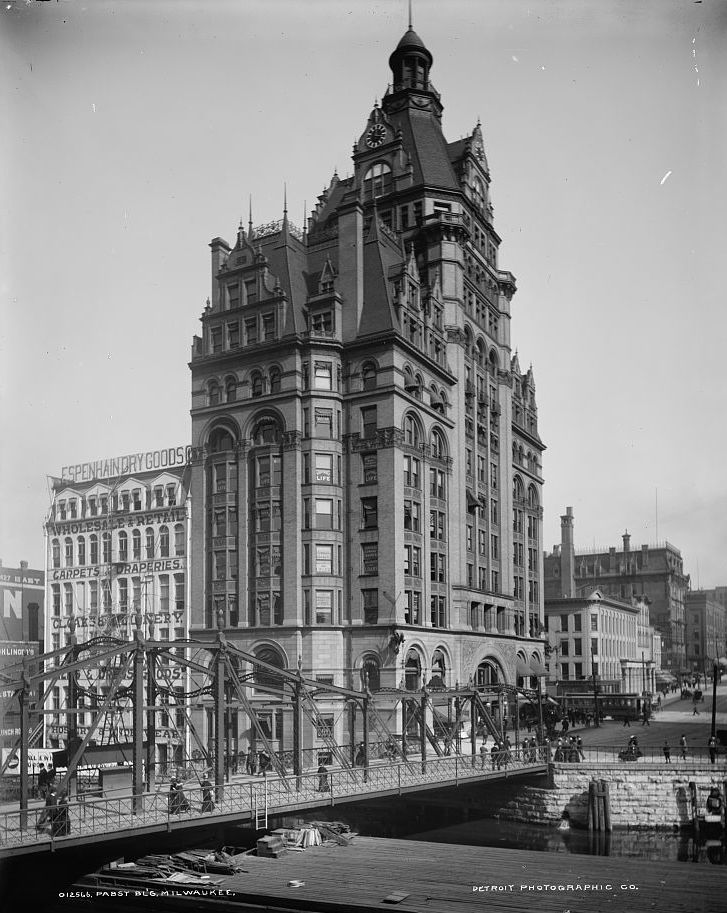
The Pabst Building was the first skyscraper in Milwaukee, Completed in 1891, Demolished in 1981.

==== Agriculture ====
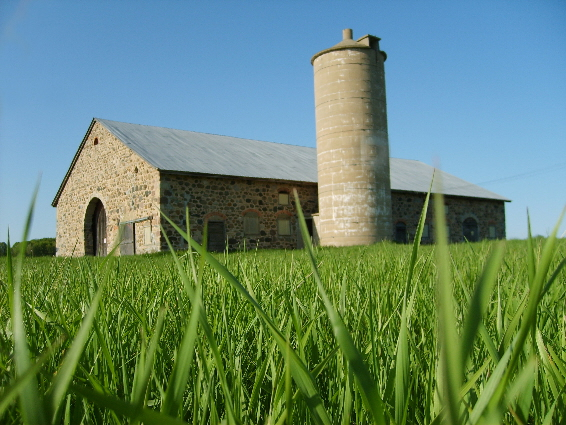
A stone barn built for cows in Wisconsin. The circular silo was used to store feed.

Agriculture was a major component of the Wisconsin economy during the 19th century. Wheat was a primary crop on early Wisconsin farms. In fact, during the mid-19th century, Wisconsin produced about one sixth of the wheat grown in the United States. However, wheat rapidly depleted nutrients in the soil, especially nitrogen, and was vulnerable to insects, bad weather, and wheat leaf rust. In the 1860s, chinch bugs arrived in Wisconsin and damaged wheat across the state. As the soil lost its quality and prices dropped, the practice of wheat farming moved west into Iowa and Minnesota. Some Wisconsin farmers responded by experimenting with crop rotation and other methods to restore the soil's fertility, but a larger number turned to alternatives to wheat.

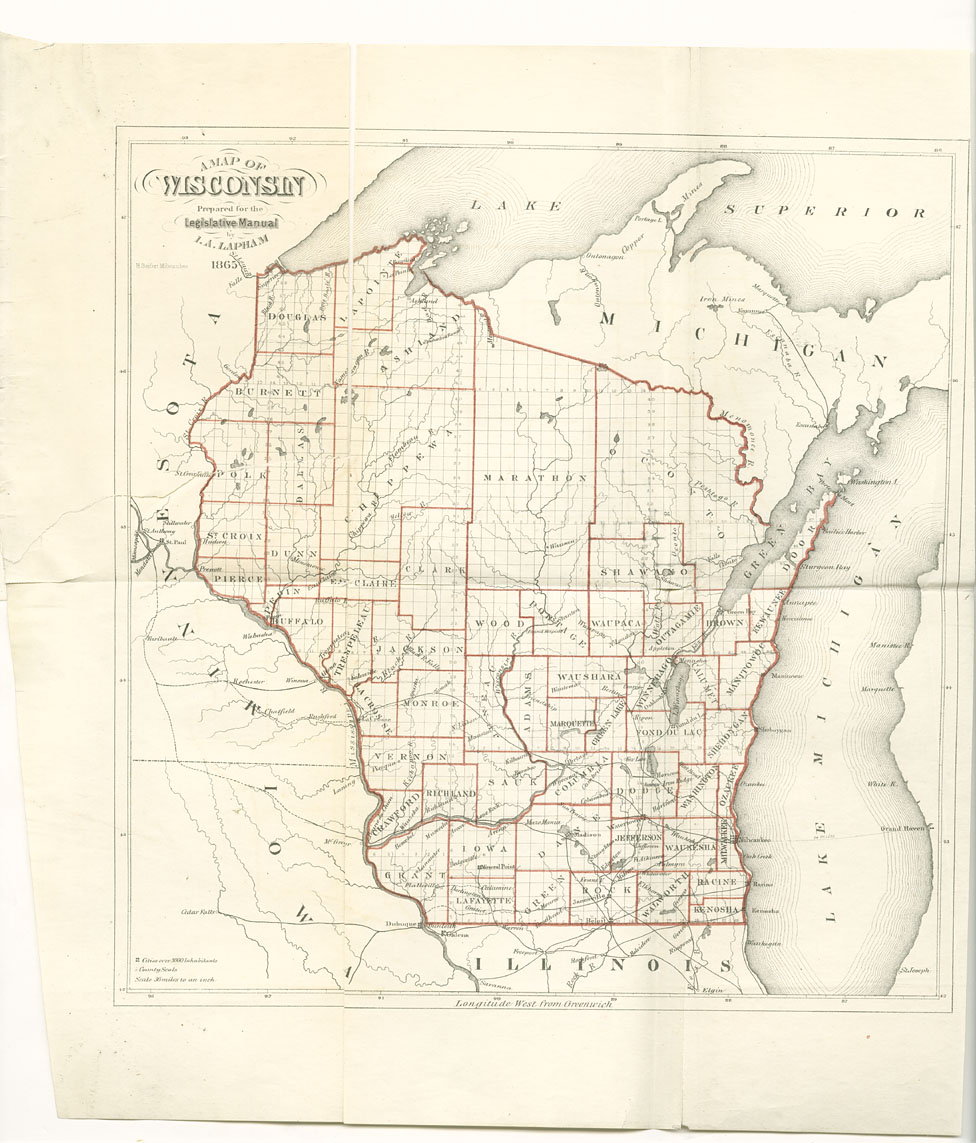
1865 map Wisconsin prepared by Increase Lapham

In parts of northern Wisconsin, farmers cultivated cranberries and in a few counties in south central Wisconsin, farmers had success growing tobacco, but the most popular replacement for wheat was dairy farming. As wheat fell out of favor, many Wisconsin farmers started raising dairy cattle and growing feed crops, which were better suited to Wisconsin's climate and soil. One reason for the popularity of dairy farming was that many of Wisconsin's farmers had come to the state from New York, the leading producer of dairy products at the time. In addition, many immigrants from Europe brought an extensive knowledge of cheese making. Dairying was also promoted by the University of Wisconsin–Madison's school of agriculture, which offered education to dairy farmers and researched ways to produce better dairy products. The first test of butterfat content in milk was developed at the university, which allowed for consistency in the quality of butter and cheese. By 1899, over ninety percent of Wisconsin farms raised dairy cows and by 1915, Wisconsin had become the leading producer of dairy products in the United States, a position it held until the 1990s. The term America's Dairyland appeared in newspapers as early as 1913 when the state's butterfat production became first in the nation. In 1939 the state legislature enacted a bill to add the slogan to the state's automobile license plates. It continues to be the nation's largest producer of cheese, no longer focusing on the raw material (milk) but rather the value-added products. Because of this, Wisconsin continues to promote itself as "America's Dairyland", Wisconsinites are referred to as cheeseheads in some parts of the country, including Wisconsin, and foam cheesehead hats are associated with Wisconsin and its NFL team, the Green Bay Packers.

==== Brewing ====
The first brewery in Wisconsin was opened in 1835 in Mineral Point by brewer John Phillips. A year later, he opened a second brewery in Elk Grove. In 1840, the first brewery in Milwaukee was opened by Richard G. Owens, William Pawlett, and John Davis, all Welsh immigrants. By 1860, nearly 200 breweries operated in Wisconsin, more than 40 of them in Milwaukee. The huge growth in the brewing industry can be accredited, in part, to the influx of German immigrants to Wisconsin in the 1840s and 1850s. Milwaukee breweries also grew in volume due to the destruction of Chicago's breweries during the great Chicago fire. In the second half of the 19th century, four of the largest breweries in the United States opened in Milwaukee: Miller Brewing Company, Pabst Brewing Company, Valentin Blatz Brewing Company, and Joseph Schlitz Brewing Company. In the 20th century Pabst absorbed Blatz and Schlitz, and moved its brewery and corporate headquarters to California. Miller continues to operate in Milwaukee. The Jacob Leinenkugel Brewing Company opened in Chippewa Falls, Wisconsin in 1867.

==== Logging ====
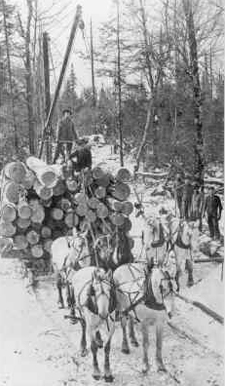
Logs being transported on a sleigh after being cut

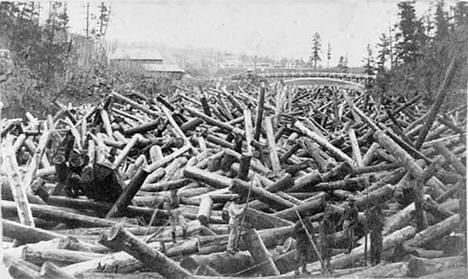
St. Croix Falls, 1865, log jam

Agriculture was not viable in the densely forested northern and central parts of Wisconsin. Settlers came to this region for logging. The timber industry first set up along the Wisconsin River. Rivers were used to transport lumber from where the wood was being cut, to the sawmills. Sawmills in cities like Wausau and Stevens Point sawed the lumber into boards that were used for construction. The Wolf River also saw considerable logging by industrious Menominee. The Black and Chippewa Rivers formed a third major logging region. That area was dominated by one company owned by Frederick Weyerhaeuser. The construction of railroads allowed loggers to log year-round, after rivers froze, and go deeper into the forests to cut down previously unshippable wood supplies. Wood products from Wisconsin's forests such as doors, furniture, beams, shipping boxes, and ships were made in industrial cities with connects to the Wisconsin lumber industry such as Chicago, Milwaukee, Sheboygan, and Manitowoc. Milwaukee and Manitowoc were centers for commercial ship building in Wisconsin. Many cargo ships built in these communities were used to transport lumber from logging ports to major industrial cities. Later a growing paper industry in the Fox River Valley made use of wood pulp from the state's lumber industry.

Logging was a dangerous trade, with high accident rates. On October 8, 1871, the Peshtigo Fire burned 1,875 square miles (4,850 km^{2}) of forest land around the timber industry town of Peshtigo, Wisconsin, killing between 1,200 and 2,500 people. It was the deadliest fire in United States history.

Paper Mills in Appleton in 1900

From the 1870s to the 1890s, much of the logging in Wisconsin was done by immigrants from Scandinavia.

By the beginning of the twentieth century, logging in Wisconsin had gone into decline. Many forests had been cleared and never replanted and large corporations in the Pacific Northwest took business away from the Wisconsin industry. The logging companies sold their land to immigrants and out of work lumberjacks who hoped to turn the acres of pine stumps into farms, but few met with success.

Wisconsin is known in the 18th century to have discovered gold deposits in western Wisconsin. Such discoveries occurred around the town of St. Croix Falls where a settler stumbled across a gold nugget valued to be worth lots at the time. It's no surprise Wisconsin's western region was once the site of volcanic eruptions so it makes sense that minerals that weren't commonly found in other parts of the state would be present here.

== 20th century ==
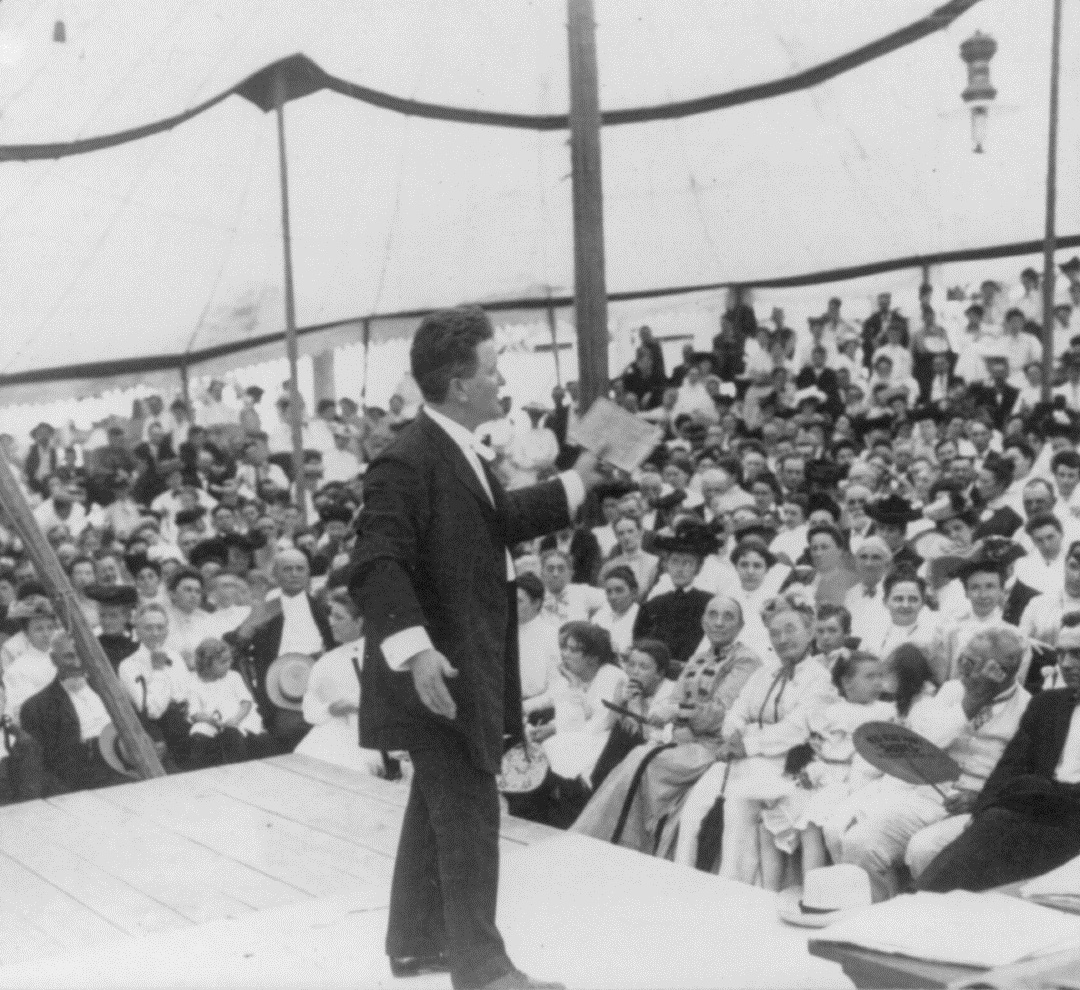
Wisconsin Governor Robert La Follette in 1905

=== Progressive Era (1900-1917) ===
Wisconsin was a regional and national model for innovation and organization in the Progressive Era in the early 20th century. The direct primary law of 1904 made it possible to mobilize voters against the previously dominant political machines. The first factors involved the La Follette family going back and forth between trying control of the Republican Party and third-party activity. Secondly the Wisconsin idea, of intellectuals and planners based at the University of Wisconsin shaping government policy. LaFollette started as a traditional Republican in the 1890s, where he fought against populism and other radical movements. He broke decisively with the state Republican leadership, and took control of the party by 1900, all the time quarrelling endlessly with ex-allies.

The Wisconsin Idea was the commitment of the University of Wisconsin under President Charles R. Van Hise, with LaFollette support, to use the university's powerful intellectual resources to develop practical progressive reforms for the state and indeed for the nation.

Between 1901 and 1911, Progressive Republicans in Wisconsin created the nation's first comprehensive statewide primary election system, the first effective workplace injury compensation law, and the first state income tax, making taxation proportional to actual earnings. The key leaders were Robert M. La Follette and (in 1910) Governor Francis E. McGovern. However, in 1912 McGovern supported Roosevelt for president and LaFollette was outraged. He made sure the next legislature defeated the governor's programs and that McGovern was defeated in his bid for the Senate in 1914. The Progressive movement split into hostile factions. Some was based on personalities—especially La Follette's style of violent personal attacks against other Progressives, and some was based on who should pay, with the division between farmers (who paid property taxes) and the urban element (which paid income taxes). This disarray enabled the conservatives (called "Stalwarts") to elect Emanuel Philipp as governor in 1914. The Stalwart counterattack said the Progressives were too haughty, too beholden to experts, too eager to regulate, and too expensive. Economy and budget cutting was their formula.

Wisconsin at this time was a de facto one party state, as the Democratic Party was then a minor conservative group in the state. Serious opposition more often than not came from the Social Democratic Party of Wisconsin, with a strong German and union constituency in Milwaukee. The socialists often collaborated with the progressive Republicans in statewide politics. Senator Robert M. La Follette tried to use his national reputation to challenge President Taft for the Republican nomination in 1912. However, as soon as Roosevelt declared his candidacy, most of La Follette's supporters switched to the former president. During the Wilson administration he supported many of Wilson's domestic programs in Congress, however he strongly opposed Wilson's foreign policy, and mobilized the large German and Scandinavian populations in Wisconsin to demand neutrality during World War I. During the final years of his career, he split with the Republican Party and ran a progressive third party campaign for president in 1924. In his bid for the presidency he won 1/6 of the national popular vote, but was only able to win his home state.

=== World War I ===
During World War I, due to the neutrality of Wisconsin and many Wisconsin Republicans, progressives, and German immigrants which made up 30 to 40 percent of the state population, Wisconsin would gain the nickname "Traitor State" which was used by many "hyper patriots".

As the war raged on in Europe, Robert M. La Follette, leader of the anti-war movement in Wisconsin, led a group of progressive senators in blocking a bill by president Woodrow Wilson which would have armed merchant ships with guns. Many Wisconsin politicians such as Governor Phillipp and senator Irvine Lernroot were accused of having divided loyalties. Even with outspoken opponents to the war, at the onset of the war many Wisconsinites would abandon neutrality. Businesses, labor and farms all enjoyed prosperity from the war. With over 118,000 going into military service, Wisconsin was the first state to report for four national drafts conducted by the U.S. military.

=== Roaring Twenties and the New Deal ===
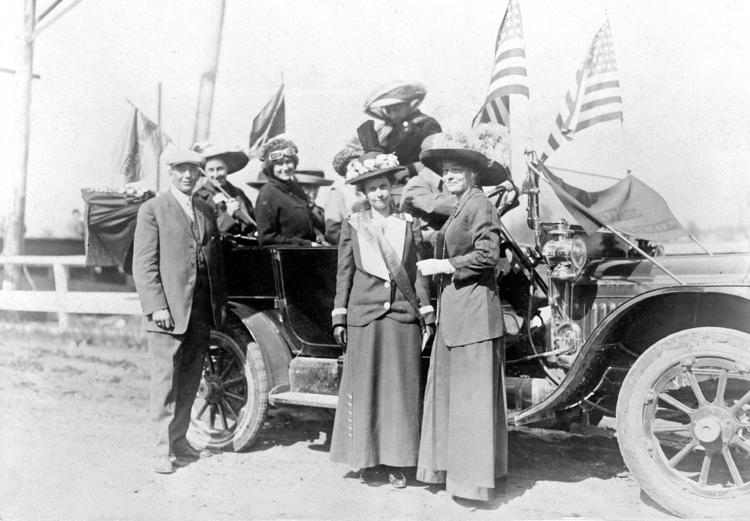
Suffragists campaigning, 1916. Wisconsin was among the earliest states to ratify the Nineteenth Amendment.

The progressive Wisconsin Idea promoted the use of the University of Wisconsin faculty as intellectual resources for state government, and as guides for local government. It promoted expansion of the university through the UW-Extension system to reach all the state's farming communities. University economics professors John R. Commons and Harold Groves enabled Wisconsin to create the first unemployment compensation program in the United States in 1932. Other Wisconsin Idea scholars at the university generated the plan that became the New Deal's Social Security Act of 1935, with Wisconsin expert Arthur J. Altmeyer playing the key role. The Stalwarts counterattacked by arguing if the university became embedded in the state, then its internal affairs became fair game, especially the faculty preference for advanced research over undergraduate teaching. The Stalwarts controlled the Regents, and their interference in academic freedom outraged the faculty. Historian Frederick Jackson Turner, the most famous professor, quit and went to Harvard.

Governor Philip La Follette announces formation of the National Progressives of America, April 28, 1938.

Following Robert La Follette's death, his two sons assumed control of the Wisconsin Republican Party after a brief period of intraparty factional disputes. Following in their father's footsteps they helped form the Wisconsin Progressive Party, in many ways a spiritual successor to the party La Follette had founded in 1924. The party surged to popularity during the mid-1930s off of the inaction of the moderately conservative Schmedeman administration, and were able to gain the support of then president Franklin D. Roosevelt. Much of the new party's support could be owed to the personalities leading it, and the support of Roosevelt and progressive Democrats. The party saw success across Wisconsin's elected offices in the state and congress. Despite its popularity the party eventually declined as Philip, engulfed in scandal and accusations of authoritarianism and fiscal irresponsibility, lost re-election for the final time in 1938. Following this defeat Philip left electoral politics and joined World War II in the Pacific Theater. Due to joining the war, the National Progressives of America, an organization that Philip had hoped would precede a national realignment, faltered. The Wisconsin Progressives began to tear themselves apart as La Follette's absence led to vicious intraparty fighting which ultimately led to a vote to dissolve itself.

=== World War II and postwar Wisconsin ===
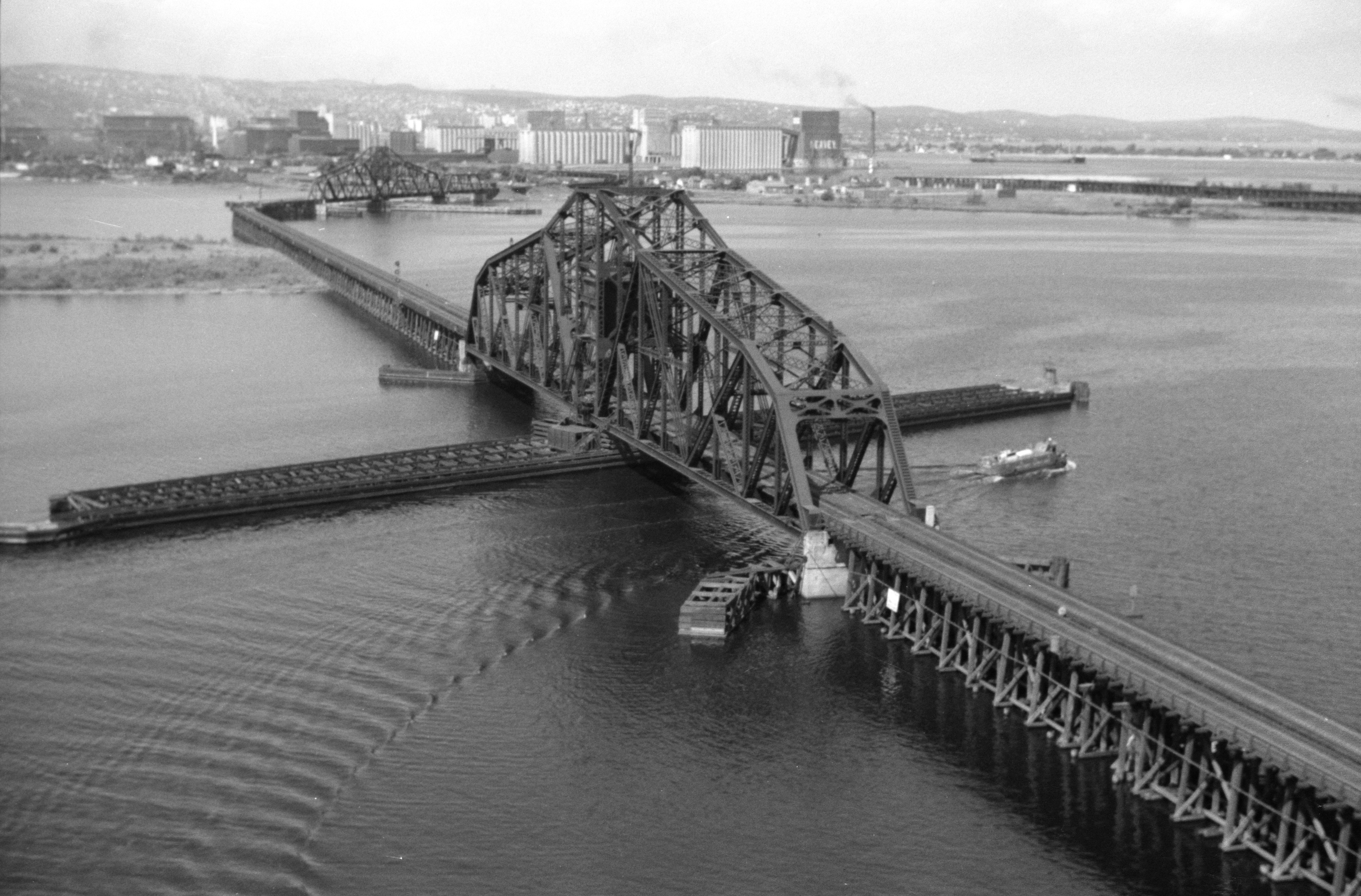
In the 20th century, Superior was a major hub for shipping iron ore across the Great Lakes via lake freighters.

Wisconsin took part in several political extremes in the mid to late 20th century, ranging from the anti-communist crusades of Senator Joseph McCarthy in the 1950s, to the founding of Earth Day by environmental advocate, Governor and Senator, Gaylord Nelson in 1970. During radical protests against the Vietnam War at UW-Madison, an attack by anarchists culminated in the Sterling Hall bombing in August 1970. The state undertook welfare reform under Republican Governor Tommy Thompson during the 1990s. The state's economy also underwent further transformations towards the close of the 20th century, as heavy industry and manufacturing declined in favor of a service economy based on medicine, education, agribusiness, and tourism.

The Wisconsin Walleye War became the name for late 20th-century events in Wisconsin in protest of Ojibwe hunting and fishing rights. In a 1975 case, the tribes challenged state efforts to regulate their hunting and fishing off the reservations, based on their rights in the treaties of St. Peters (1837) and La Pointe (1842). On August 21, 1987, U.S. District Court judge Barbara Crabb ruled that six Ojibwe tribal governments had the right under these treaties to hunt and fish throughout their former territory. Protests erupted among sports fishermen and resort owners who were opposed to tribal members spearfishing walleye during spawning season. Protests continued into 1991 until tribal supporters successfully petitioned federal courts to issue an injunction against the protesters.

== 21st century ==
=== Demographic changes ===
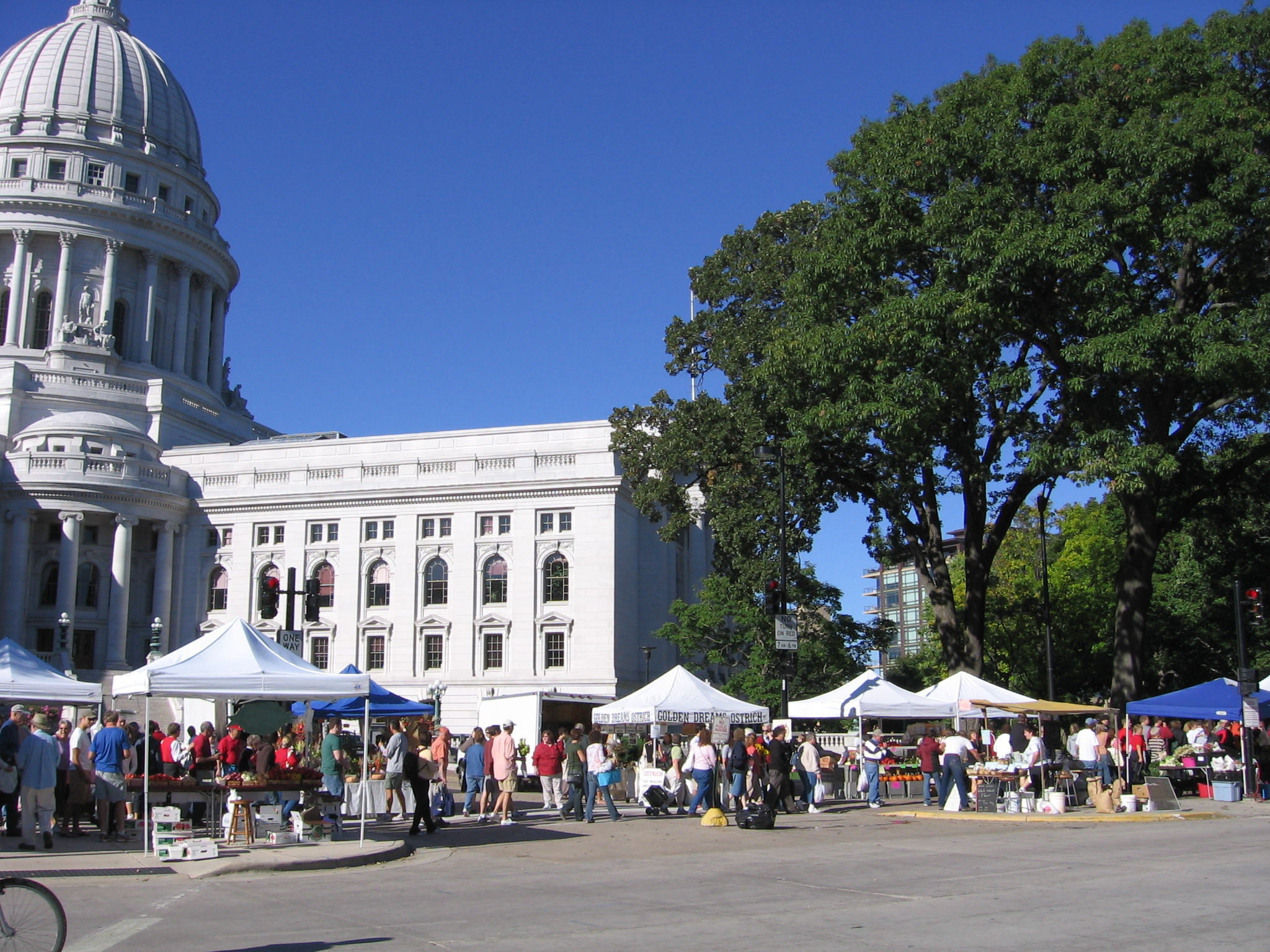
Dane County has led the state in population growth in the 21st century.

Wisconsin's population has grown in the 21st century, and this growth has been led by the Madison metropolitan area around Dane County. This county's population increased by 43% from 2000 to 2025. By some metrics, Dane County's population growth is greater than the next six counties combined. Most other urban areas in Wisconsin have grown, with the major exception of Wisconsin's largest county, Milwaukee.

Wisconsin's rural population has also grown during the 21st century. It grew at 5.1% from 2000 to 2022, faster than any Midwestern state's rural population except North Dakota. The rural counties that have grown the fastest are tourist hubs like Sauk County (home of Ho-Chunk Casino and near Wisconsin Dells) and Walworth County (home of Lake Geneva and Alpine Valley). Although the rural population grew overall, some individual rural counties declined in population. These shrinking counties include Richland, Rusk, Crawford, Taylor, Shawano, and Langlade. They typically have a higher share of their economy from agriculture than other Wisconsin counties.

Wisconsin has seen growth in its Latino population in the 21st century, rising to 7.6% of Wisconsinites. The Latino population has outpaced the African American population to become the largest minority in the state, just as they are in the United States generally. Latino growth has been driven by both second-generation families having more children and increases in immigrants. Immigrants cite security to raise a family and better job opportunities as reasons to moving to Wisconsin. Many Latinos work in Wisconsin's famous dairy industry.

=== Environmental ===
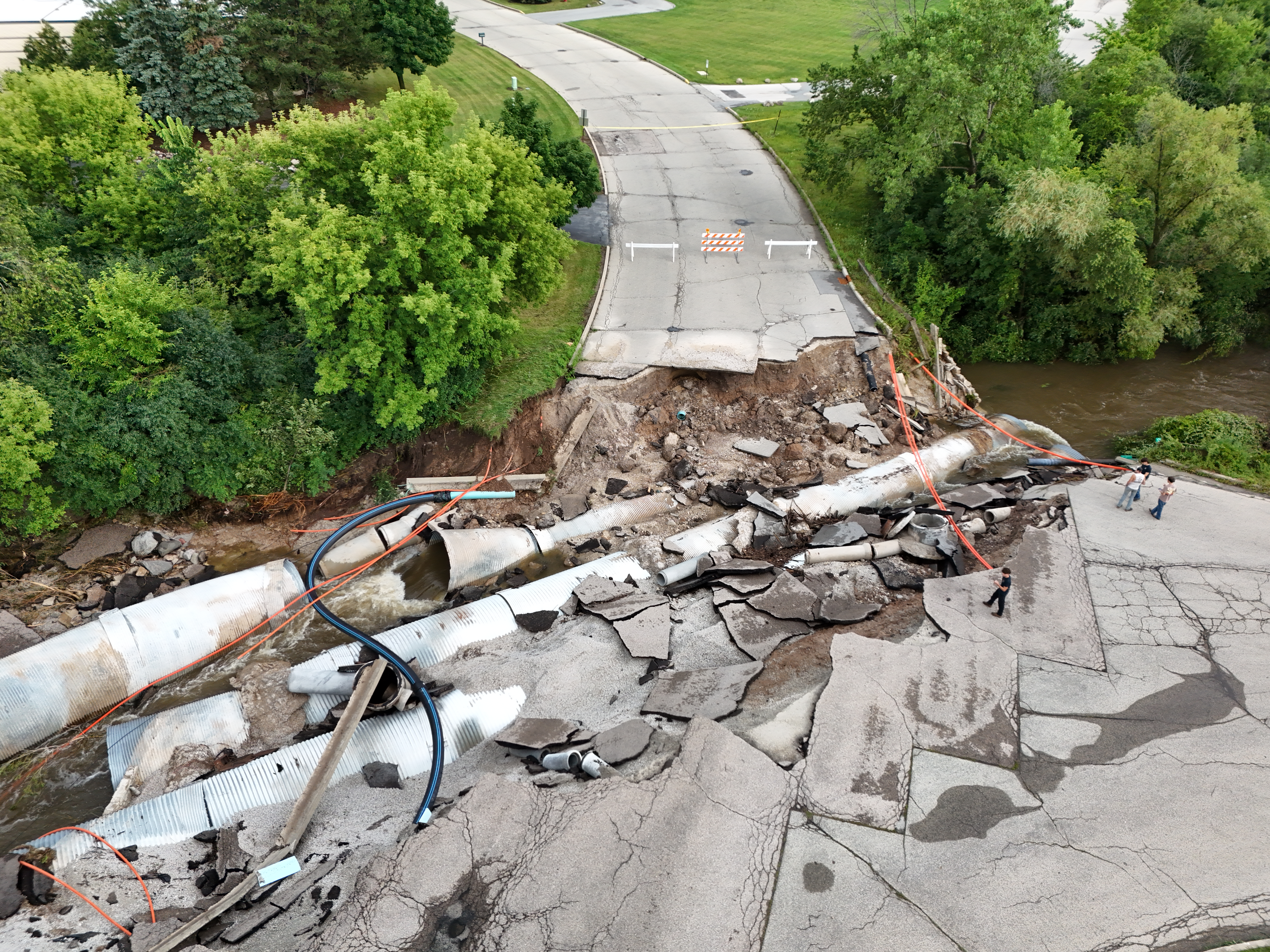
Climate change has accelerated weather/climate disaster events, such as the flooding in Menomonee Falls in 2025.

Climate change has affected Wisconsin in the 21st century. The state has seen an increase in weather/climate disaster events, especially recently. There were only 9 disaster events from 1980 to 2000, followed by 32 in 2001–2020, and 22 from 2021 to 2024. These include an increase in severe storms, floods, and droughts. The state expects to see further effects from climate changes in areas such as agriculture (including wild rice), forestry, and tourism.

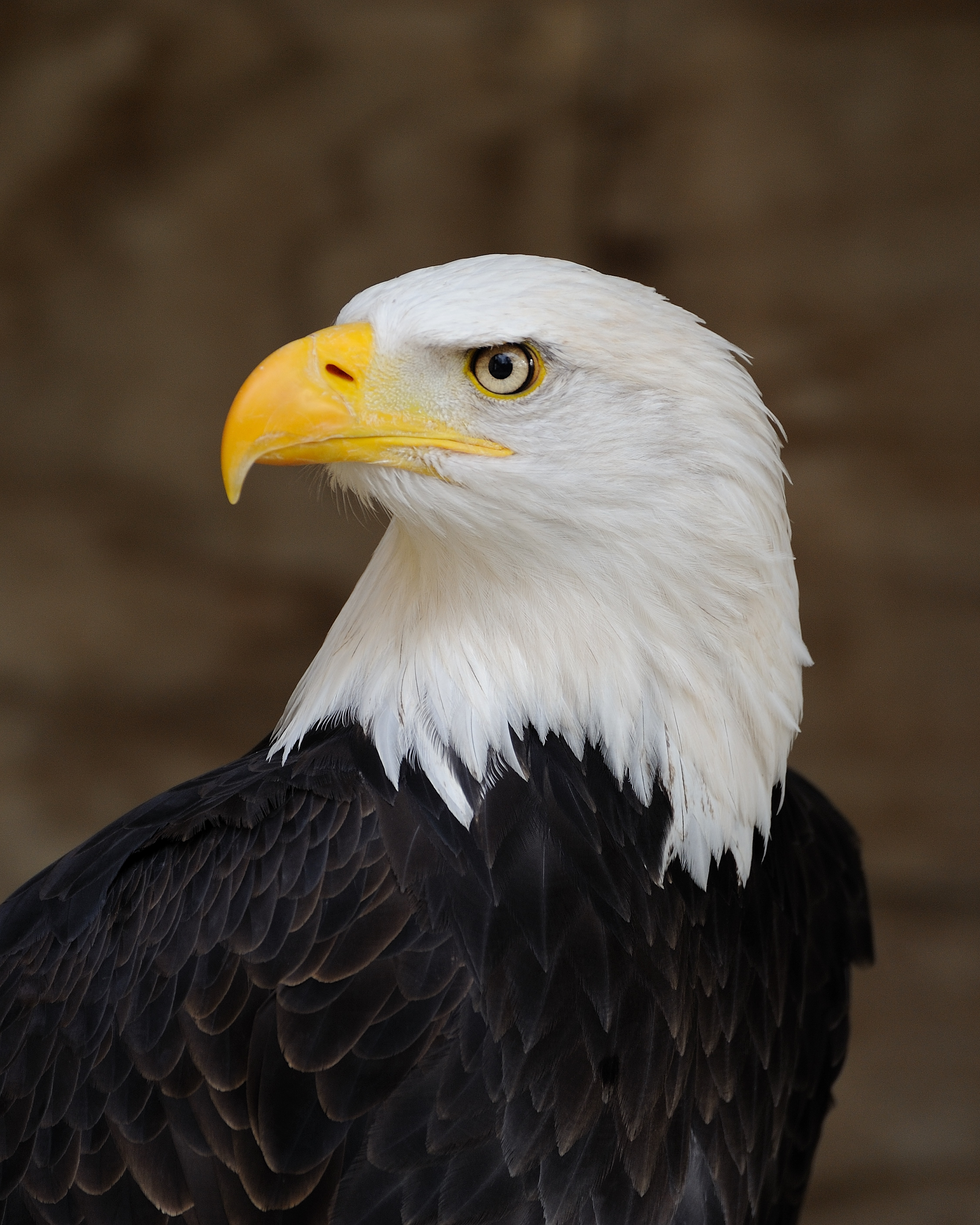
Bald eagles have been seen in nearly every county in Wisconsin in the 21st century, a major recovery since the end of the 20th century.

During the 21st century, Wisconsin has succeeded in reintroducing mammals that had long been extirpated from the state. Elk and moose all once lived in Wisconsin, then went extinct within the state, and now have been found again. In 1995, the Wisconsin Department of Natural Resources reintroduced 25 elk to the state, and the elk population has since grown to over 400. At least one moose has been born in Wisconsin in the 21st century. Other mammals have also been a target for reintroduction or protection. The wolf population has increased from 0 to 6000 by the year 2023. River otters are at risk, but have recovered some population since being listed as a protected species in 1999.

Large birds have seen recoveries, including the wild turkey, which was extinct in the state in the 1970s and now has large harvests each spring. Bald Eagles have recovered from over 108 to over 1000, in part due to the ban of DDT, but also due to changes in nesting behavior and warming climate. The Trumpeter swan population, which was zero from 1880 to 1989, has grown so much since their reintroduction that they were removed from the state's endangered species list in 2009. The Sandhill crane population has also grown from its lowest point around 25 pairs in 1937 to thousands today.

Wisconsin has had mixed success on preventing unwanted invasive species from entering the state. The quagga mussel spread through Lake Michigan along Wisconsin's shore. It has also been found in Wisconsin's inland lakes, including Geneva Lake. So far, Wisconsin has had more success with Asian carp. The state has partnered with the federal government and the state of Illinois to prevent the unwanted fish from reaching Lake Michigan or the Mississippi River on the western border of the state.

=== Political history ===
Politically, the Wisconsin state government has leaned towards Republican control in the 21st century. The Wisconsin State Assembly has been controlled by the Republican Party for the entire century, except for the two-year period of the 99th Legislature. From 2011 to 2019, Republicans had full control of the government: Republican Scott Walker was governor, Republicans controlled both chambers of the Legislature, and the state Supreme Court leaned conservative. The Democrats have never had full control of the government in the 21st century; the closest was from 2009 to 2011, when there was a Democratic governor and Legislature, but the court leaned conservative. Currently, the Legislature is controlled by Republicans but the governor is Democratic and the state supreme court leans liberal.

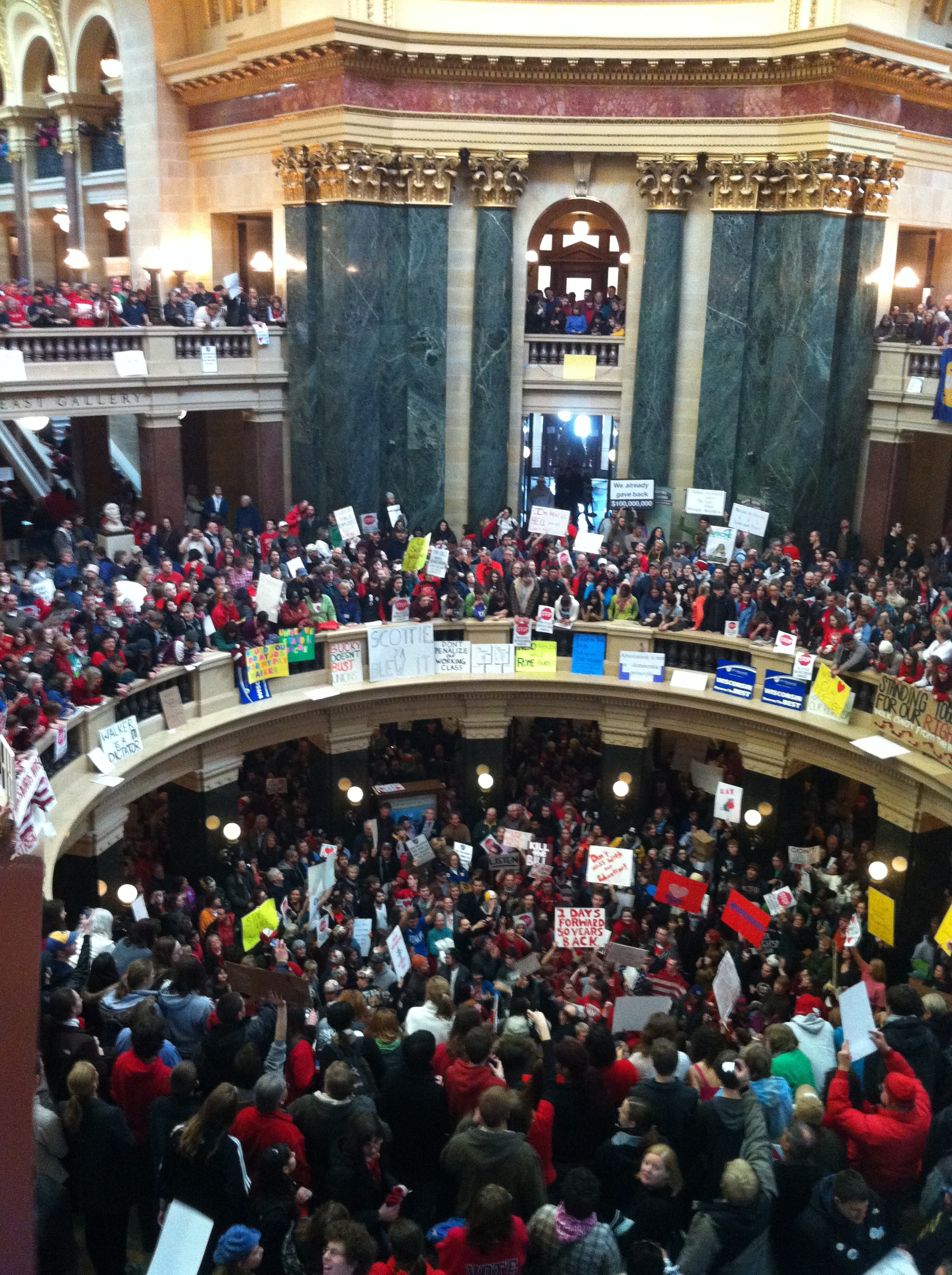
Thousands gather inside Madison Wisconsin's Capitol rotunda to protest Governor Walker's 2011 Wisconsin Act 10.

The most consequential changes to Wisconsin law occurred when Republicans had full control of the government. In 2011, Wisconsin became the focus of some controversy when newly elected governor Scott Walker proposed and then successfully passed and enacted 2011 Wisconsin Act 10, which made large changes in the areas of collective bargaining, compensation, retirement, health insurance, and sick leave of public sector employees, among other changes. A series of major protests by union supporters took place that year in protest to the changes, and Walker survived a recall election held the next year, becoming the first governor in United States history to do so. Walker enacted other bills promoting conservative governance, such as a right-to-work law, abortion restrictions, and legislation removing certain gun controls. Walker's administration also made critical changes to Wisconsin's election process, enacting one of the most aggressive legislative gerrymanders in the country and replacing Wisconsin's nonpartisan state elections board with a commission of political appointees.

When Walker lost re-election in 2018, he collaborated with the gerrymandered Republican legislature to strip powers from the incoming Governor and Attorney General. Since 2011, Wisconsin has seen increasing governmental dysfunction and paralysis, as the durable gerrymander insulated the legislature from electoral consequences.

Following the election of Tony Evers as governor in 2018, Wisconsin has seen a string of liberal victories at every level of government which have slowly chipped away at the conservative dominance within the state. This eventually led to the Wisconsin Supreme Court overturning the Walker-era legislative gerrymander in Clarke v. Wisconsin Elections Commission.

=== Economic development ===
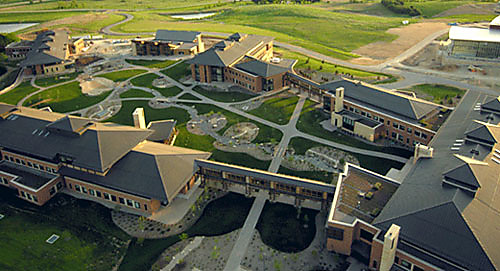
Epic Systems campus in Verona, Wisconsin

During the 21st century, Wisconsin's economy has changed most by continuing its shift from manufacturing jobs to service, healthcare, and education jobs. In the first years of the century, employment in the manufacturing sector declined so that the "Trade, Transportation, and Utilities" sector became the largest sector in the state. Employment in manufacturing continued to decline while employment in "Education and Health Services" grew to surpass manufacturing employment by 2025. Today, the most common job in the state is caring for older adults or people with disabilities.

The mix of work in Wisconsin has also changed due to the aging workforce. Like much of the rest of the country, Wisconsin has seen large growth in the percentage of the labor force that is older than 55. While the overall labor force in the state has shrunk by about 70,000 people from 2000 to 2018, the number of individuals in the workforce aged 55 or older grew from 391,000 to 764,000.

One growing sector is the biohealth industry, which is largely concentrated near the capital Madison. This sector has grown quickly and includes high salaries for its employees. Among its largest employers are the digital health firm Epic Systems, Promega, and Accuray.

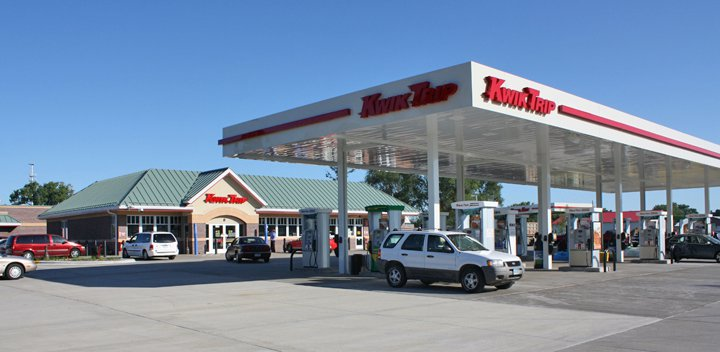
A typical Kwik Trip store

Some of the state's top employers, like Walmart and the University of Wisconsin, were among the top employers both at the beginning of the century and today. Other employers have emerged to become among the largest employers, including Kwik Trip, the University of Wisconsin hospitals, Amazon, Kroger, Froedtert Hospital and the Medical College of Wisconsin, and Target.

The state also experimented with tax incentives for the film industry from 2008 to 2013. The first major production to take advantage was Michael Mann's Public Enemies. While the producers spent $18 million on the film, it was reported that most of it went to out-of-state workers and for out-of-state services; Wisconsin taxpayers had provided $4.6 million in subsidies, and derived only $5 million in revenues from the film's making. During this period, the movie Transformers: Dark of the Moon also used Milwaukee as a filming location. This incentive was eliminated in 2013.

=== Civil unrest and police shootings ===
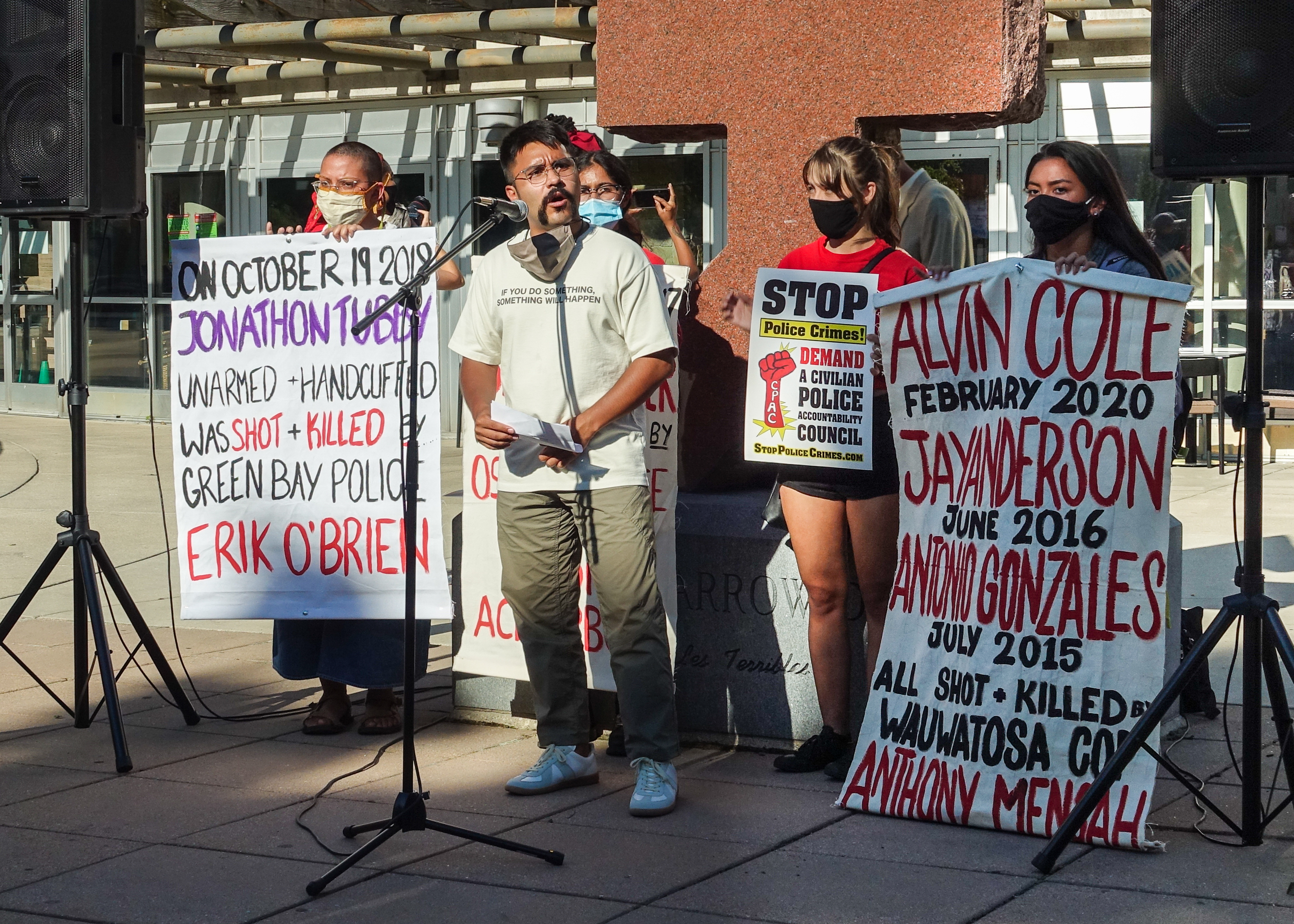
Protests over the shooting of Alvin Cole

The twenty-first century saw civil unrest stemming from police officers fatally shooting people. The first major unrest of the century occurred in 2016, when riots occurred in Milwaukee. These were sparked by the fatal police shooting of 23-year-old Sylville Smith. During the three-day turmoil, several people, including police officers, were injured and dozens of protesters arrested. According to a Milwaukee Fire Department official, the riots caused around $5.8 million worth of damage to the neighborhood businesses. This "rough estimate" includes commercial real estate damage, as well as lost merchandise. At least seven businesses were affected.

The growing Black Lives Matter movement raised awareness of police shootings, especially in 2020. Protests in Wauwatosa followed the Killing of Alvin Cole by a police officer. Other groups besides Black Lives Matter were involved; in Wauwatosa, much of the protester activity was organized by a smaller local group called the "People's Revolution."

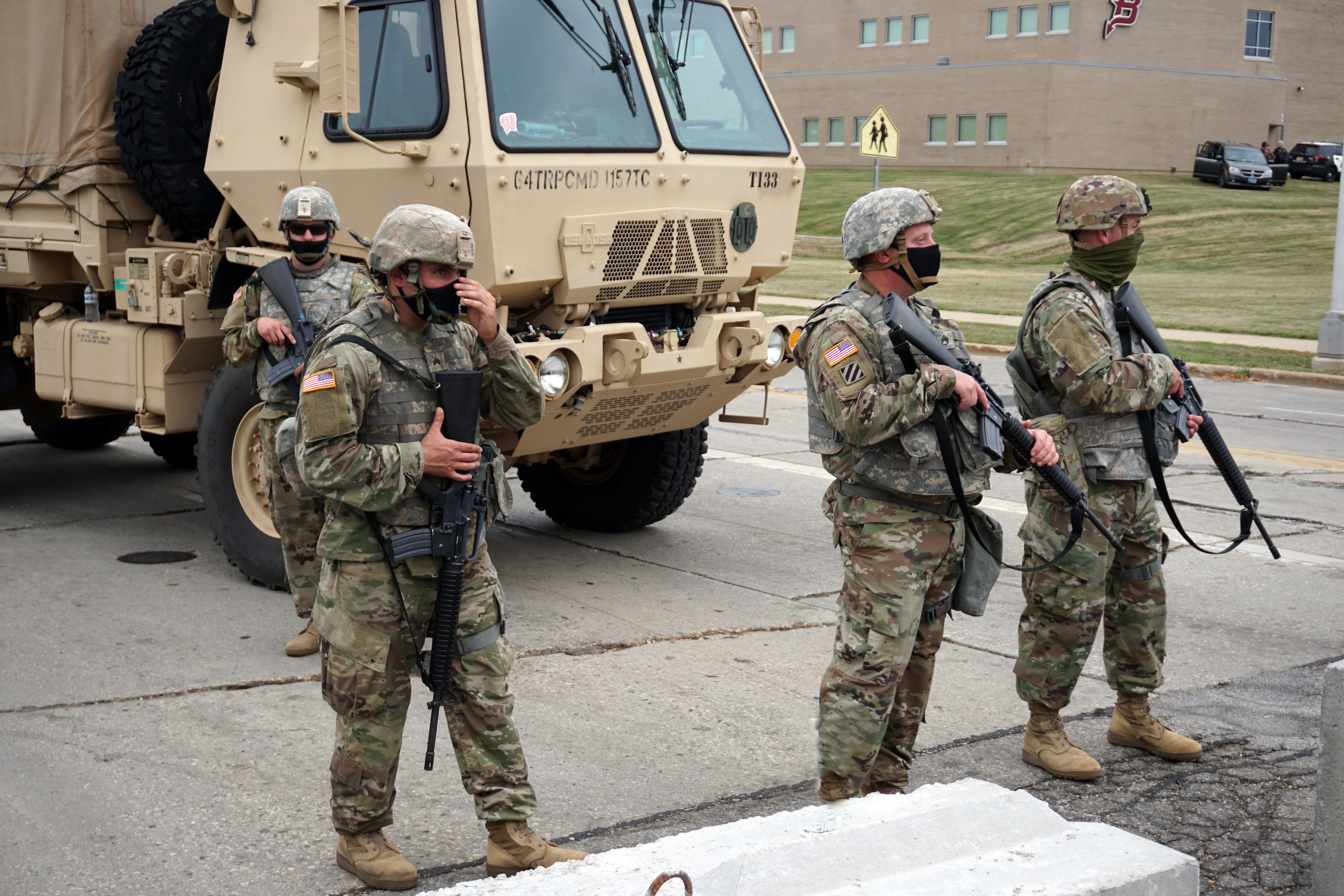
National guard troops in Kenosha, Wisconsin, during the unrests from the shootings

The most high-profile unrest occurred in the city of Kenosha in 2020 following the shooting of Jacob Blake. Protests and riots followed. More shootings followed, this time by 17-year-old Kyle Rittenhouse who shot and killed two men. The event was covered by national media; the shooter was described as a "vigilante" or "terrorist" by some and "volunteer" by others.

Wisconsinites were evenly split on their approval of protests against police during 2020, with 47% supporting and 48% opposing. Since then, police shootings in Wisconsin have continued to rise, with Wisconsin "a regional leader in fatal encounters."

=== Education ===
In 2023, University of Wisconsin–Platteville Richland shut down, marking the first time a UW campus has closed since UW Medford in 1980. Following this closure, four other University of Wisconsin branch campuses have closed. Additionally, one campus has gone entirely online and another has stopped using several of its campus buildings. Many have expressed concerns about the future of the Wisconsin Idea following these closures.

== See also ==
- Wisconsin Magazine of History, scholarly articles on Wisconsin history
- Women's suffrage in Wisconsin
- History of the Midwestern United States
- History of Milwaukee, Wisconsin
- History of cheesemaking in Wisconsin
- Northwest Territory
- List of Wisconsin Civil War units
- List of governors of Wisconsin
- List of historical societies in Wisconsin

== Bibliography ==
=== Surveys ===
- Buenker, John (1988). "Wisconsin: As Maverick, Model, and Microcosm". In Madison, James H. (ed.). Heartland: Comparative Histories of the Midwestern States. Indiana University Press. pp. 59–85. ISBN 9780253205766.
- Buenker, John D. The History of Wisconsin, Volume 4: The Progressive Era, 1893–1914. Madison: State Historical Society of Wisconsin, 1998. highly detailed history
- Campbell, Henry C. Wisconsin in Three Centuries, 1684-1905 (4 vols.: 1, 2, 3, 4, 1906), highly detailed popular history
- Conant, James K. Wisconsin Politics And Government: America's Laboratory of Democracy (2006)
- Current, Richard. Wisconsin: A History (2001) online
- Current, Richard Nelson. History of Wisconsin, Volume 2: The Civil War Era, 1848–1873. Madison: State Historical Society of Wisconsin, 1976. standard state history
- Gara, Larry. A Short History of Wisconsin (1962)
- Glad, Paul W. War, a New Era, and Depression, 1914-1940 (Volume 5 of History of Wisconsin) (1990) excerpt
- Holmes, Fred L. Wisconsin (5 vols., Chicago, 1946), detailed popular history with many biographies
- Klement, Frank L. Wisconsin in the Civil War: The Home Front and the Battle Front, 1861-1865. (State Historical Society of Wisconsin, 1997). online
- Nesbit, Robert C. Wisconsin: A History (rev. ed. 1989) online
- Nesbit, Robert C. The History of Wisconsin, Volume 3: Industrialization and Urbanization 1873–1893. (Madison: State Historical Society of Wisconsin, 1973).
- Quaife, Milo M. Wisconsin, Its History and Its People, 1634-1924 (4 vols., 1924), detailed popular history & biographies
- Raney, William Francis. Wisconsin: A Story of Progress (1940)
- Robinson, A. H. and J. B. Culver, ed., The Atlas of Wisconsin (1974) online
- Smith, Alice. The History of Wisconsin, Volume 1: From Exploration to Statehood. Madison: State Historical Society of Wisconsin, 1973.
- Van Ells, Mark D. Wisconsin [On-The-Road Histories]. (2009).
- Vogeler, Ingolf, et al. Wisconsin: A Geography (Routledge, 2021) online.
- Weber, Ronald E. Crane and Hagensick's Wisconsin government and politics (2004) [Crane and Hagensick's Wisconsin government and politics online]
- Wisconsin biographical dictionary: people of all times and all places who have been important to the history and life of the state (1991) online
- Wisconsin Cartographers' Guild. Wisconsin's Past and Present: A Historical Atlas (2002)
- Works Progress Administration. Wisconsin: A Guide to the Badger State (1941) detailed guide to every town and city, and cultural history

=== Specialized scholarly studies ===
- Anderson, Theodore A. A Century of Banking in Wisconsin (1954)
- Apps, Jerry. Meet Me on the Midway: A History of Wisconsin Fairs (Wisconsin Historical Society, 2022).
- Apps, Jerry. When the White Pine was King: A History of Lumberjacks, Log Drives, and Sawdust Cities in Wisconsin (Wisconsin Historical Society, 2020).
- Barker, Brett, et al. Union Heartland: The Midwestern Home Front during the Civil War (SIU Press, 2013).
- Boatman, John F. Wisconsin American Indian history and culture: a survey of selected aspects (1998) online
- Braun, John A. Together in Christ: A History of the Wisconsin Evangelical Lutheran Synod (2000)
- Brøndal, Jørn. Ethnic Leadership and Midwestern Politics: Scandinavian Americans and the Progressive Movement in Wisconsin, 1890–1914. (2004) ISBN 0-87732-095-0
- Butts, Porter. Art in Wisconsin (1936)
- Clark, James I. Education in Wisconsin (1958)
- Cochran, Thomas C. The Pabst Brewing Company (1948)
- Corenthal, Mike Illustrated History of Wisconsin Music 1840–1990: 150 Years (1991)
- Curti, Merle and Carstensen, Vernon. The University of Wisconsin: A History (2 vols., 1949)
- Curti, Merle. The Making of an American Community A Case Study of Democracy in a Frontier County (1969), in-depth quantitative social history
- Fowler, Robert Booth, Wisconsin votes : an electoral history (2008) online
- Fries, Robert F. Empire in Pine: The Story of Lumbering in Wisconsin, 1830–1900 (1951).
- Geib, Paul. "From Mississippi to Milwaukee: A Case Study of the Southern Black Migration to Milwaukee, 1940–1970" The Journal of Negro History, Vol. 83, 1998 online
- Gough, Robert J. Farming the cutover: A social history of northern Wisconsin, 1900-1940 (University Press of Kansas, 1997).
- Haney, Richard C. A history of the Democratic Party of Wisconsin, 1949-1989 (1989)
- Haney, Richard C. A concise history of the modern Republican Party of Wisconsin, 1925-1975 (1976)
- Holter, Darryl. "Labor Law and the Road to Taft-Hartley: Wisconsin's Little Wagner Act, 1935-1945." Labor studies Journal 15 (1990): 20+.
- Jensen, Richard The Winning of the Midwest: Social and Political Conflict, 1888–1896 (1971) online
- Lampard, Eric E. The Rise of the Dairy Industry in Wisconsin (1962)
- Leahy, Stephen M. The Life of Milwaukee's Most Popular Politician, Clement J. Zablocki: Milwaukee Politics and Congressional Foreign Policy (Edwin Mellen Press, 2002).
- McBride, Genevieve G. Women's Wisconsin: From Native Matriarchies to the New Millennium (2005) excerpt
- Margulies, Herbert F. The Decline of the Progressive Movement in Wisconsin, 1890–1920 (1968)
- Merrill, Horace S. William Freeman Vilas: Doctrinaire Democrat (1954) Democratic leader in 1880s and 1890s
- Olson, Frederick I. Milwaukee: At the Gathering of the Waters
- Ozanne, Robert W. The Labor Movement in Wisconsin: A History (Wisconsin Historical Society, 2012).
- Ostergren, R. C. A Community Transplanted: The Trans-Atlantic Experience of a Swedish Immigrant Settlement in the Upper Middle West, 1835-1915. (University of Wisconsin Press, 1q988).
- Schafer, Joseph. A History of Agriculture in Wisconsin (1922)
- Schafer, Joseph. "The Yankee and the Teuton in Wisconsin". Wisconsin Magazine of History, 6#2 (December 1922), 125–145, compares Yankee and German settlers
- Spoolman, Scott. Wisconsin Waters: The Ancient History of Lakes, Rivers, and Waterfalls (Wisconsin Historical Society, 2022).
- Still, Bayrd. Milwaukee: The History of a City (1948) online
- Teaford, Jon C. Cities of the heartland: The rise and fall of the industrial Midwest (Indiana University Press, 1993). online
- Thelen, David. Robert M. La Follette and the Insurgent Spirit (1976)
- Thompson, William F. The History of Wisconsin: Volume 6: Continuity and Change 1940-1965. Madison: State Historical Society of Wisconsin, 1988.
- Unger, Nancy C. Fighting Bob La Follette: The Righteous Reformer (2000)
- WPA. The WPA guide to Wisconsin (1939) reprint of the Federal Writers' Project guide to 1930's Wisconsin. online

=== Primary sources ===
- Wisconsin Electronic Reader full text of many primary source books
- The Badger State: A documentary history of Wisconsin (1979)
- La Follette's Autobiography, a personal narrative of political experiences, 1913

=== Scholarly journal articles ===
- Wisconsin Magazine of History archive of scholarly articles, Free access
