= History of cheesemaking in Wisconsin =

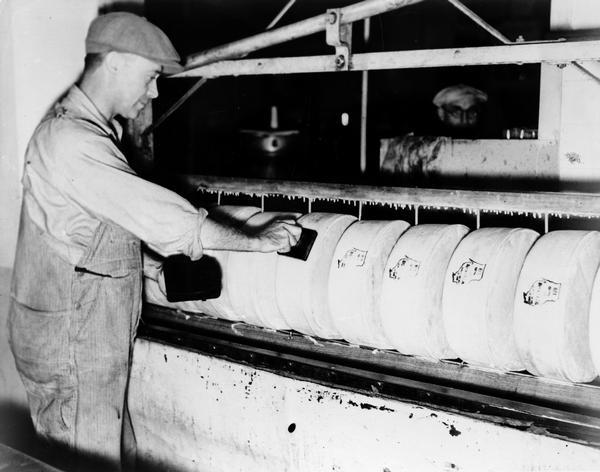
Dairy is a major industry in Wisconsin. Pictured is a worker in 1922 at a New Glarus cheese factory placing a Wisconsin stamp on wheels of cheese.

Commercial cheesemaking in Wisconsin dates back to the nineteenth century. Early cheesemaking operations began on farmsteads in the Michigan and Wisconsin territories, with large-scale production starting in the mid-1800s. Wisconsin became the largest producer of cheese in the United States in the early 1900s, and in 2019 produced 3.36 billion pounds of cheese in more than 600 varieties, accounting for 27% of all cheese made in the country that year. Several cheese varieties originated in Wisconsin, including colby, brick, and cold pack.

== History ==
=== 1830s–1880: Early years ===
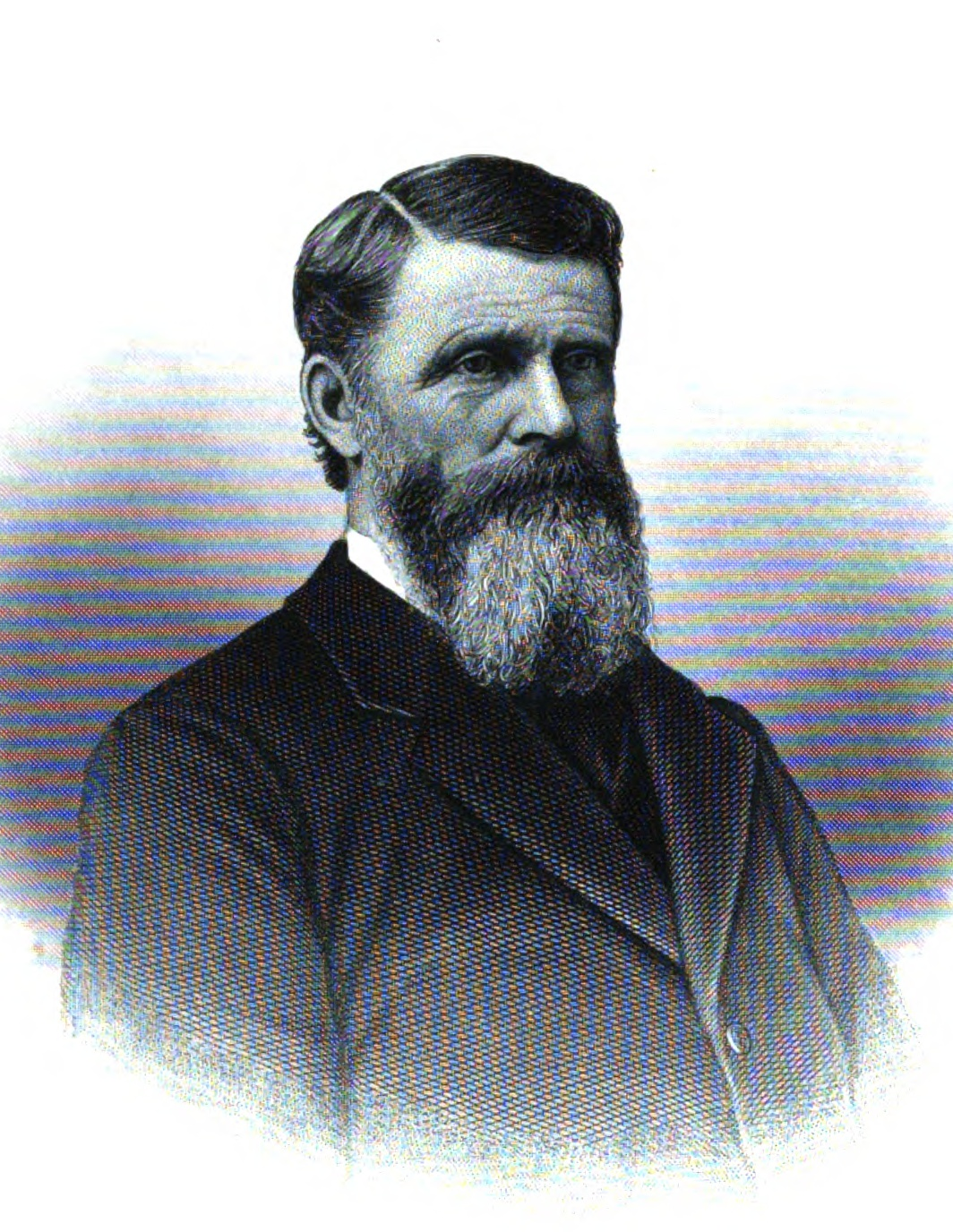
Chester Hazen is regarded as the first cheese factory proprietor in Wisconsin.

Dairy farming was uncommon in Wisconsin's early years. Farmers preferred to plant crops, primarily wheat. Cows were generally tended to by women on farmsteads, who in turn made cheese and butter from the milk. Early larger-scale cheesemaking operations began in the late 1830s, primarily as agricultural cooperatives involving neighboring families. The first documented cheesemaking cooperative in Wisconsin was opened by A. Pickett in 1841 and operated from his home near Lake Mills. Selling Wisconsin-made cheese outside the state's borders was difficult in these early years, with buyers typically preferring cheese produced in New York. These sales were typically handled by the factory and a cheese dealer. This led to the creation of dairy boards, which acted as a place for cheese buyers and sellers to meet, and call boards, which allowed cheese buyers to bid on available product. Industrialization of the cheese industry in the state was slow, and scholars disagree on when the first commercial cheese factory was founded in the state. Historian Frederick Merk noted in 1916 that the lack of a clear definition of what constitutes a cheese factory makes it difficult to make a definitive pronouncement of which one was first; however, Chester Hazen is regarded as opening the first large-scale cheese factory in the state. Hazen's factory opened in Ladoga in 1864.

It should be noted in this connection that the definition of a cheese factory is more or less arbitrary. It is not easy to say with precision what a factory is, or just when a private dairying establishment may be said to have ceased to be such and developed into a cheese factory... The factory system may be said to have been reached only when some individual agrees to take the milkings of so large a number of cows (usually regarded as about 100) as to necessitate giving all, or at least the major portion, of his time and attention to cheese manufacture.

— Frederick Merk, Economic History of Wisconsin During the Civil War Decade, 1916, p.23

Following a decline in the wheat crop after 1860 caused by a variety of factors, including lower prices, pests, disease, and a volatile climate, Wisconsin farmers began raising other crops and livestock, though dairy farming would not become the dominant industry for several decades. The growth of cheese production mirrored the growth in dairy farming, and the number of cheese factories in Wisconsin grew from 30 factories in 1860 to more than 700 in 1880. Operations were concentrated in Sheboygan County, where factories primarily produced cheddar cheese, and Green County, where factories primarily produced Swiss and limburger cheese.

=== 1880–1990: Regulation and mass production ===
==== Government intervention on quality ====
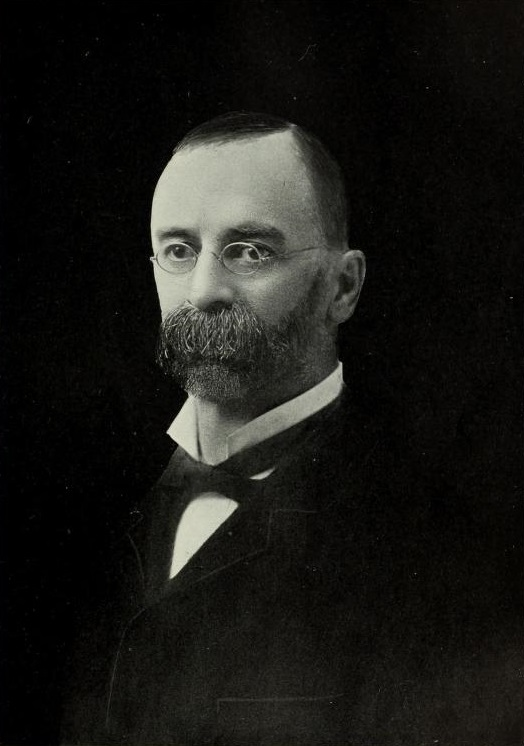
University of Wisconsin-Madison professors Harry Luman Russell and Stephen M. Babcock (pictured) developed processes for cold-curing cheese in the late 19th and early 20th centuries that significantly improved the quality and consistency of cheese made in Wisconsin.

Early cheesemakers often struggled to make a consistent product due to variations in the milk they received and ongoing risk of contamination due to poor sanitation practices. By the 1880s, some farmers sought to increase the value of the milk produced, and would dilute the milk with water or skim cream off the top before sending it to the cheese factory. Some factory owners also skimmed the cream for use in other products. This resulted in "skimmed" or "filled" cheese, a cheese that quickly spoiled and lost its flavor. The production of this cheese damaged Wisconsin's reputation for quality cheesemaking. After pressure from the Wisconsin Dairymen's Association and the election of dairy advocate William Dempster Hoard as Wisconsin's 16th governor, the Wisconsin Legislature created the Office of the Dairy and Food Commissioner in 1889 to oversee cheese production in the state. Wisconsin outlawed the sale of filled cheese in 1895.

==== Research improvements ====
Advances in food science in the 1890s also helped the cheesemaking industry. University of Wisconsin-Madison professor Stephen M. Babcock developed the Babcock test in 1890 for measuring butterfat content. This helped ensure cheesemakers received unadulterated milk. Babcock did not patent the test, leading to its widespread adoption in North America. In 1896, Babcock and fellow professor Harry Luman Russell examined the mechanisms of cheese maturation, discovering that an enzyme they named galactase, rather than bacteria as had been previously thought, caused the cheese to ripen. They published the discovery in 1897 and built upon it with the development of the cold-curing method, in which cheese is aged in rooms between 40 and 50 degrees Fahrenheit. This method was published in 1901 and began to see widespread use in the state by 1910.

While academic research improved the techniques used to make cheese during the late nineteenth century, UW-Madison began offering practical training to cheesemakers, launching a professional course on cheese and butter production in 1890. In the 12-week Dairy Short Course, students learned production and cleaning techniques. Many of these early facilities lacked rigorous cleaning standards, resulting in low-quality cheese. One inspector remarked of the worst offenders in 1906:

At the worst class of factories...the intake room, walls, presses, and jacket of milk vats [were] badly bespattered and greasy; the ceiling black with fly-specks, floor dirty and nearly all utensils unclean... No efforts were made to keep flies out or to reduce the number inside and some of them became tangled up in the milk and curd and were mixed up with the cheese.

— E.L. Aderhold, Biennial report of the Dairy and Food Commissioner of Wisconsin. For the two years ending June 30, 1906, 1906, p.174

Quality standards continued to rise, and in 1915 Wisconsin became the first state to require cheesemakers to be licensed. Six years later, Wisconsin became the first state to require grading of its cheese.

==== Market domination ====
Cheesemaking had concentrated in the eastern and southern regions of the state by 1910, with Green, Dodge, Iowa, Lafayette, and Sheboygan counties accounting for a plurality of cheese factories in Wisconsin. The popularity of the state's cheese rose during the 1910s, as did its production capacity, and by 1919 Wisconsin produced more than 63% of all cheese made in the United States.

Cheese factories by county, 1910
County	Number of factories
Green	213
Dodge	141
Iowa	128
Lafayette	118
Sheboygan	111
Outagamie	99

In 1909, a call board in Plymouth changed its rules to allow any cheese factory in the state to sell its product on the Plymouth board. Similar boards had previously served small areas. This rule change led to the Plymouth call board becoming the largest in the state, and in 1918, it was reorganized and renamed the Wisconsin Cheese Exchange. By 1936, the Exchange was used to set national prices for cheese, leading to a number of price fixing lawsuits levied against cheese purchasers by the United States Department of Justice Antitrust Division.

The number of cheese factories in the state reached its zenith in 1922 at 2,807, after which many smaller plants closed or merged with their neighbors. These closures were due primarily to the widespread adoption of the automobile and development of milk trucks, which could travel from farm to factory quicker than a farmer with a horse and wagon. Despite the decrease in the number of factories, cheese production continued to rise, increasing from 307.4 million pounds in 1920 to 406.9 million pounds in 1940.

By the 1950s, advances in milk production and transportation, including the adoption of milk houses—storage buildings separated from a barn by a wall—refrigerated bulk tanks, and milk tanker trucks, further increased the quality of milk and cheese produced in the state. The growing popularity of pizza during the decade led some Wisconsin cheese manufacturers to produce more mozzarella cheese; by 2017, Wisconsin produced more mozzarella than any other variety.

=== 1990–2020: Consolidation and industry changes ===
Carr Valley Cheese, near La Valle, Wisconsin, produces more than 90 varieties of cheese.

Throughout the latter half of the twentieth century, cheese factories in Wisconsin continued to consolidate and close, with the number of factories declining from 1,279 in 1950 to 126 by 1999. Cheese production was concentrated into large-scale cheese operations or small boutique factories. Large producers manufactured bulk cheddar, mozzarella, and American cheese, while small operations made lesser-used "specialty cheese," including varieties such as asiago, havarti, and gorgonzola.

The Wisconsin Cheese Exchange, which had moved to Green Bay in 1956 and was renamed the National Cheese Exchange in 1974, continued its operations, selling cheese by the train car load. Nationwide prices for bulk cheese and by extension, the milk to produce it, were set by the Exchange. Following the reduction of milk price support via the Food Security Act of 1985 and the Food, Agriculture, Conservation, and Trade Act of 1990, as well as giveaways by the Reagan administration of cheese purchased by the Commodity Credit Corporation in the 1980s, milk and cheese prices became much more volatile. Only small amounts of cheese were actually sold on the Exchange, but the Exchange was susceptible to price fixing by large buyers, which affected cheese prices nationally on all markets. A 1996 study by researchers at UW-Madison found that Kraft Foods Inc. had engaged in such manipulation in the early 1990s. This price manipulation, which caused milk and cheese prices to drop significantly, led to the dissolution of the Exchange in 1997.

The state continued to focus on quality and launched the first and only master cheesemaking program in the United States in 1994, graduating its first class of master cheesemakers in 1997. Cheese advocates sought to increase the production of artisan cheese in the state in the early 2000s, leading to the creation of the Dairy Business Innovation Center in 2004. The center was funded by the federal government with money secured by U.S. Senator Herb Kohl. Between its founding in 2004 through its closure in 2012, the center helped create 43 cheese factories in the state. By 2018, Wisconsin cheese factories produced more than 600 varieties of specialty cheese, approximately 50% of all specialty cheeses made in the United States. Wisconsin manufactured 3.36 billion pounds of cheese in 2019, accounting for 26% of all cheese produced in the United States and more than any other state.

== Wisconsin varieties ==
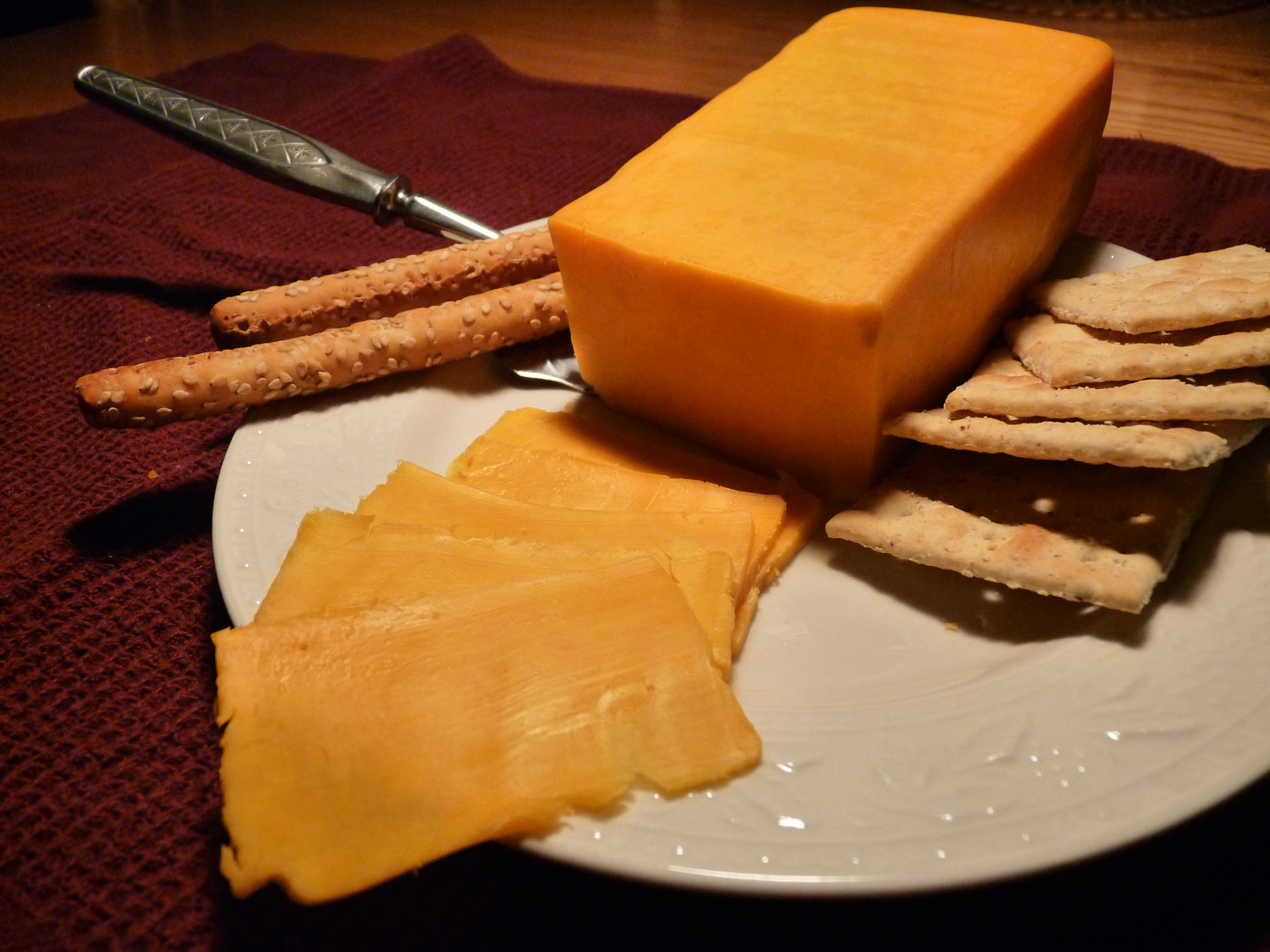
Colby cheese was invented in Colby in 1885.

Several varieties of cheese originated or are produced only in Wisconsin, including brick, colby, cold pack, and limburger.

=== Brick cheese ===
Brick cheese was invented in 1877 by John Jossi. It is a mild semsisoft cheese that ranges in color from white to pale yellow. It is often used on Detroit-style pizza.

=== Colby cheese ===
Colby cheese was first produced in 1885 in Colby, from which it derives its name, by Joseph F. Steinwand. It is similar to cheddar in appearance and flavor, though is milder and softer. Colby can be mixed with Monterey Jack cheese to form Colby-Jack.

=== Cold pack cheese ===
Cold pack or club cheese was invented in Wisconsin bars near the end of the nineteenth century. It is a blend of cheeses, seasonings, and cream, mashed together in a jar to make a spread.

=== Limburger cheese ===
Limburger cheese originated in the Duchy of Limburg in Belgium. It is noted for its strong odor, caused by the bacteria which ripens the cheese. It was commonly served with dark bread and onions until Prohibition went into effect in 1920, after which its popularity declined. As of 2020, the only cheese factory that produces limburger cheese in the United States is the Chalet Cheese Cooperative in Monroe.

== See also ==
- Agriculture in Wisconsin – Cultivation of plants and animals in Wisconsin
- Cheesehead – Nickname for people from Wisconsin
- Cheesemaking – Craft of making cheese
- William D. Hoard – American politician, publisher, and advocate (1836–1918)
- Wisconsin dairy industry – Overview of the milk producing industry in Wisconsin
