= National Cheese Exchange =

Defunct cheese exchange

The National Cheese Exchange (NCE) was a private non-profit corporation that operated in Green Bay, Wisconsin. Every Friday morning for one-half hour, members of the NCE met to buy or sell cheddar cheese in 40-pound (18 kg) blocks and 500-pound (230 kg) barrels on the exchange. The closing prices were published and widely circulated throughout the dairy industry, and were used as the basis for buying and selling cheese throughout the food distribution system. Up until April 1997 the USDA used changes in the NCE price as a principal component in determining the basic formula price for all milk sold under federal milk marketing orders. Activity on the NCE was regulated by the Wisconsin Department of Agriculture and the Wisconsin Attorney General.

In May 1997, cheese trading moved to the Chicago Mercantile Exchange.
