= Arthur R. Hoard House =

Historic house in Wisconsin, United States

- U.S. National Register of Historic Places
- U.S. Historic district – Contributing property
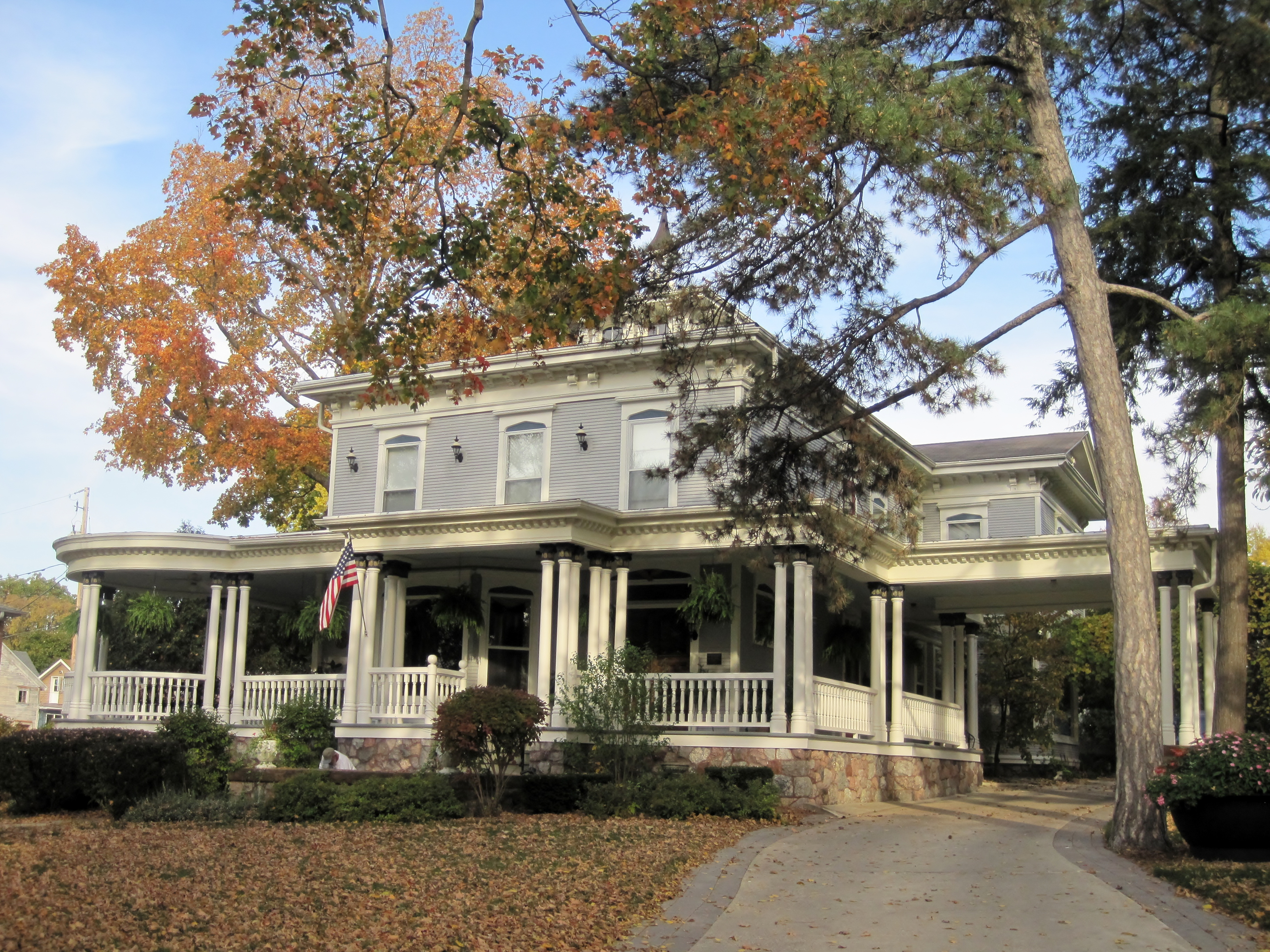

- Location within Wisconsin Location within the United States
- Location: 323 Merchants Ave., Fort Atkinson, Wisconsin
- Coordinates: 42°55′28″N 88°50′7″W
- Area: 0.6 acres (0.24 ha)
- Built: 1865
- Architectural style: Italianate, Queen Anne
- Part of: Merchants Avenue Historic District (ID86001303)
- NRHP reference No.: 82001845
- Added to NRHP: November 30, 1982

The Arthur R. Hoard House, also known as the George P. Marston House, is a historic residence in Fort Atkinson, Wisconsin, United States. The house was owned by several important early families in the town, including two mayors and a state representative.

== History ==
George P. Marston purchased the plot of land to build a house in 1853. Marston owned a dry goods shop on Main Street in Fort Atkinson, Wisconsin, and operated a branch in nearby Cold Spring. He also owned the Fort Atkinson Brewery and was a major shareholder of the Southwell Lumber Company. In 1871, due to his failing health, Martson moved in with his son, George Marston, in San Diego, California. He sold the house to Dr. Henry O. White, of whom little is known; he sold the house to Dr. Horace B. Willard in 1888, a director of the Northwestern Manufacturing Company, the vice president of the Citizens State Bank, and the owner of the Willard & Co. store. Willard also served in the Wisconsin State Assembly. He only lived in the house for a few months before moving again following the death of his wife.

In 1889, the house was sold to attorney W. H. Rogers. Rogers served as town clerk in 1868 and 1870-1871 and was a justice of the peace from 1868 to 1872. He was city attorney from 1870 until his death in 1907 and served a term as mayor. Arthur R. Hoard, the son of Governor William D. Hoard, purchased the house in 1893. In 1885, Hoard had founded the periodical that would become Hoard's Dairyman and a year later he founded Hoard Creameries. Hoard developed the company into a chain of eight creameries, known for making its GiltEdge butter. In 1912, he purchased stock in the Better Sox Knitting Mills, eventually becoming its president. Hoard served a term as mayor and owned Hoard's Hotel on Lake Koshkonong.

Marston had the house built in Italianate style. It stood that way until 1898, when Hoard added Queen Anne elements, including the bay windows, the veranda, the Porte-cochère, and the rounded pavilion.

The house was recognized by the National Park Service with a listing on the National Register of Historic Places on November 30, 1982. When the Merchants Avenue Historic District was recognized on June 13, 1986, the Hoard House was listed as a contributing property.

== See also ==
- George W. Marston House, owned by Marston's son
