= Main Street Historic District (Fort Atkinson) =

Historic district in Wisconsin, United States

- U.S. National Register of Historic Places
- U.S. Historic district
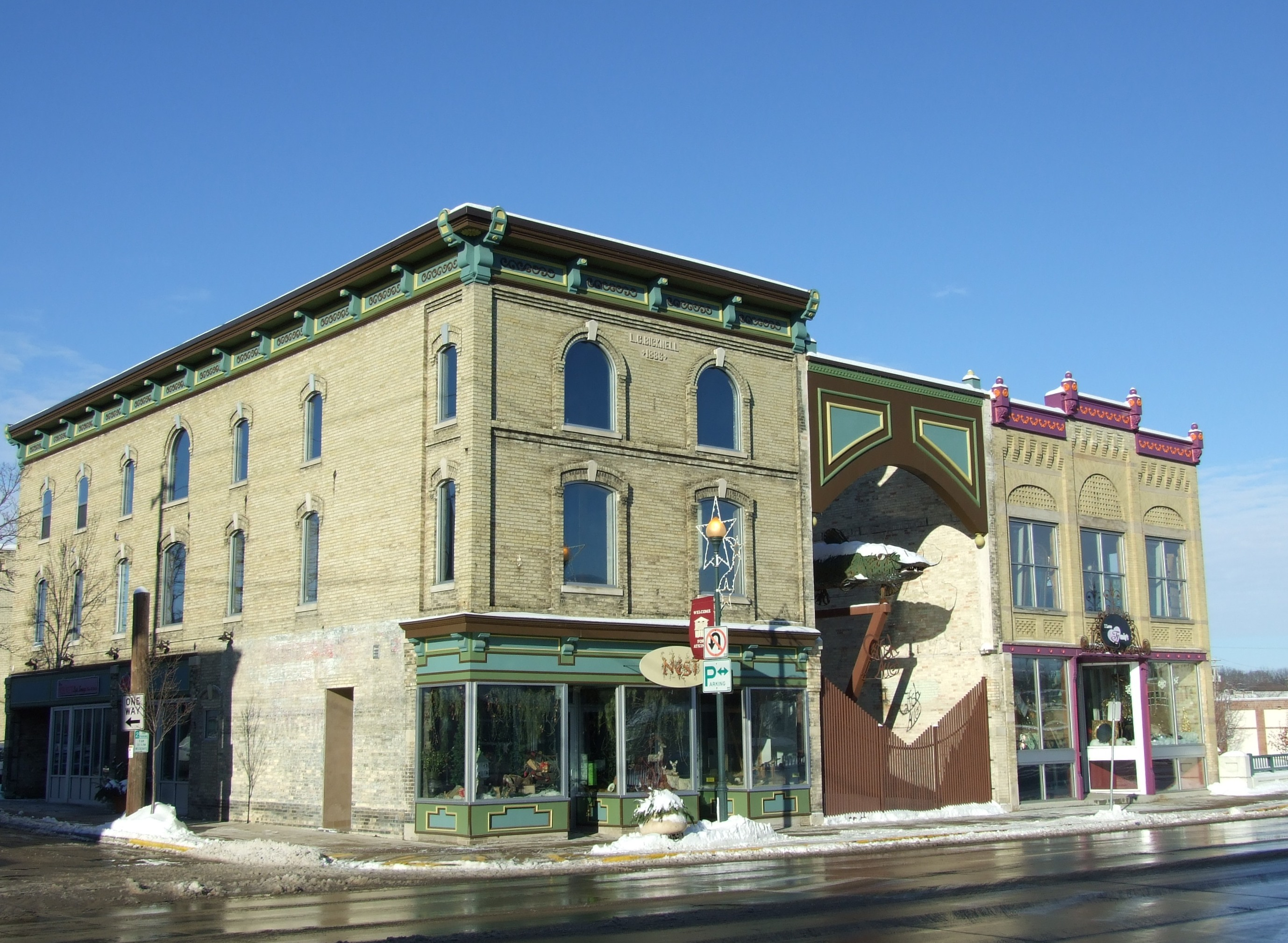

- Location within Wisconsin Location within the United States
- Location: Roughly Main St. from Sherman Ave. to S. 3rd St., Fort Atkinson, Wisconsin
- Coordinates: 42°55′41″N 88°50′15″W
- NRHP reference No.: 84003683
- Added to NRHP: June 7, 1984

The Main Street Historic District in Fort Atkinson, Wisconsin, United States, was placed on the National Register of Historic Places in 1984. The district is composed of 51 buildings on or within a block of Main Street.

Although many of the storefronts have been remodeled over the years, the original decorative brickwork is still visible on the upper levels of most buildings.

== History ==
Main Street is the oldest street in Fort Atkinson. It was originally part of a military road that connected Fort Dearborn to Fort Winnebago. The first white settlers arrived in the 1830s and settled on both sides of the Rock River. Soon after, a wooden bridge was built linking North and South Main Streets.

From the 1840s to the 1870s, Main Street had mostly wood-frame stores with wide shingled canopies resting on wooden posts. In the 1880s these small frame shops gave way to the buildings that exist today – two- and three-story brick buildings constructed with local cream brick, and adorned with fancy cornices and dentils. Canvas awnings replaced wooden canopies.

== Main street bridge ==
There have been three bridges crossing the Rock River at this location. Prior to the building of the first one in 1843, people and wagons would attempt to ford the river or were ferried across. City founder Dwight Foster operated the first ferry service using rafts and dugout canoes. The first bridge was a flimsy wooden structure built by local pioneers with material that were at hand. In 1870 an iron bridge costing $9,400 replaced it. A second iron bridge was built in 1881. In 1909 this structure was widened, with an elevated bandstand in the shape of a stockade constructed in the center. The present concrete bridge was built in 1917.

== Notable buildings ==
The buildings include:

- The Albert Winslow Grocery at 131 N Main St was built in 1857, three-story brick Italianate-styled, with fancy metal lintels over the windows. It housed a grocery store at street level and a Good Templar hall on the third floor. Winslow's brother had a doctor's office in the building and Lucien Caswell started the first bank in town on the second floor.
- The Reuben S. White Building at 101 S Main St was built in 1871, a two-story brick corner building with round-arched windows and a molded brick cornice. It initially sold drugs and groceries. Later shoes, variety, hats, and women's clothes.
- The Langholf Hotel and Saloon at 225-229 S Main St is a two-story cream brick building with a molded brick cornice, built in 1875. It also housed the Farmer's Home Hotel and served as a boardinghouse. It is Fort Atkinson's only hotel building left from the 1800s.
- The Hoard Block at 228 S Main was built one story tall in 1883 by John Becker and served as the Hoard printing plant until 1908. In 1914 a second story was added. It housed a hardware store from 1936 to 1980.
- The Hahnemann Lodge at 100 N Main St was built in 1883, a two-story brick-veneered building with corner quoins, elaborate window hoods, and elaborate cornice with false gables. It housed a grocery store from 1883 to 1942, then George Wilson's fur and clothing store. In the early years it also hosted the Hahnemann Lodge, German-speaking Odd Fellows. The design is Italianate, but has a German flavor.
- The IOOF Lodge #24 at 201 S. Main St is a two-story corner brick building with a large arched cornice and excellent brickwork, built in 1884. It housed a grocery store on the first floor and above that the Knights of Pythias, English Odd Fellows, and a labor temple.
- The Dr. L.C. Bicknell Building at 96-98 S Main St (on left in photo above) is a three-story cream brick structure built in 1886 with arched windows with keystones and an elaborate cornice. Originally Ed Hausen's barbershop was in the first floor corner, with W.D. Powell's shoes and boots to the north, Theodore Notbaum's harness shop in the rear, and Dr Bicknell's office on the second floor. A hat shop replace the barber shop in 1925, and the building housed Gebhardt's hardware store from 1926 to 1971.
- The Downing Block at 234 South Main was built in 1888 as a furniture store. William D. Hoard bought it in 1891 for his expanding publishing company. Hoard had his office on the second floor. From 1910 to 1970 it was again used as a furniture store.
- The Fred Dawes Bakery at 226 S. Main St is a two-story brick building with pilasters between the windows, metal lintels on the windows, and a fancy metal cornice. It housed a bakery until 1909, later a billiards room, grocery store, and restaurant.
- The Andra Block at 79 N Main St is a two-story cream brick building built in 1894 with corbelled cornice, and a Queen Anne-styled orieled bay. It housed a saloon until 1897, then a jewelry store until 1905.
- The Peter Imig Building at 99 S Main St was built in 1895, a two-story cream brick corner building with fine brickwork. It housed Becker's dry goods store until 1918, then Nieperts clothing store until 1976.
- The George Wilson Building at 200 N Main St was built in 1895, a two-story brick meeting hall with Romanesque Revival round arches, brick in two colors, and a Victorian cornice. It housed a dry goods store and upstairs an Odd Fellows meeting hall. Around 1909 it housed City Hall and the fire department.
- The Heuchtel Building at 96 N Main St is a two-story brick store built in 1895 with large round-arched windows on the second story, detailing in the brick, and a Victorian cornice. The building housed a grocery and tailor shop until 1935, then a clothes store.
- The Hoard Block at 232 S Main was built in 1895, and housed A.R. Hoard's Better Sox Knitting Mills. Later Roy's barber shop.
- The Abe Mack Building at 112 N Main St was built in 1898, a two-story cream brick building with an elaborate cornice, built by mason John Becker. Mack sold carriages, bikes, pianos, and real estate.
- The A.E. Kump Building at 117 N Main St is a two-story brick store built in 1901. It housed Giles Hibbard's bakery from 1907 to 1919, and the K&F Restaurant from 1940 to 1970.
- The A.C. Krueger Block at 18 S Water St was built in 1901, a two-story cream brick building with a tall triangular pediment and decorative corbeling. Gustav Neth began construction and operated a tavern there briefly, until his contractor sued him and he was jailed for forgery. Then his brother-in-law Krueger completed the building. Krueger ran the tavern until 1906, when it was replaced by the Spaeth Brewery until 1968, then Jim Vance's tavern.
- The W.D. Hoard Publishing Co. at 28 Milwaukee Ave W is a small office building, one-story cream brick in Neoclassical style, designed by George Ferry and built in 1908, from which Hoard's Dairyman magazine is published.
- The Creamery Package Manufacturing Co. at 201 N Main St is a five-story factory built in 1919 of reinforced concrete. Martin Tullgren and Sons of Milwaukee designed it in 20th Century Commercial style. The business began in 1866 as Cornish and Curtiss making rectangular butter churns, and expanded to make pasteurizing machines, cream ripeners, bottle washers, and other dairy equipment. By 1917 it was the largest dairy equipment company in the world, and employed 400 people in Fort Atkinson.
- The First National Bank at 70 N Main St is a Neoclassical building constructed in 1922.
- The Black Hawk Tavern at 9 Milwaukee Avenue West was built in 1915. Before it, Milo Jones built the Green Mountain House hotel on the site in 1848. It was later known as the Higbee House, the Snove Hotel and Hotel Fort. In 1915 Frank Hoard and Harry Curtis built the Black Hawk Tavern adjoining the hotel. In 1929 the Green Mountain House was torn down and replaced by the present Black Hawk Hotel, a three-story red brick building designed by John G. Shodron.
- The Municipal Building at 111 N Main St was built in 1929, designed by James Law in Neoclassical style. The building housed city offices, a gym, a stage, and police and fire departments.

== See also ==
- Merchants Avenue Historic District
- National Register of Historic Places listings in Jefferson County, Wisconsin
