= 1894 Wisconsin gubernatorial election =

- November 6, 1894
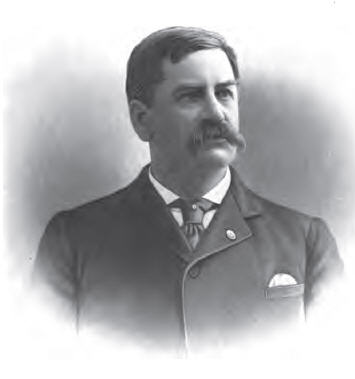

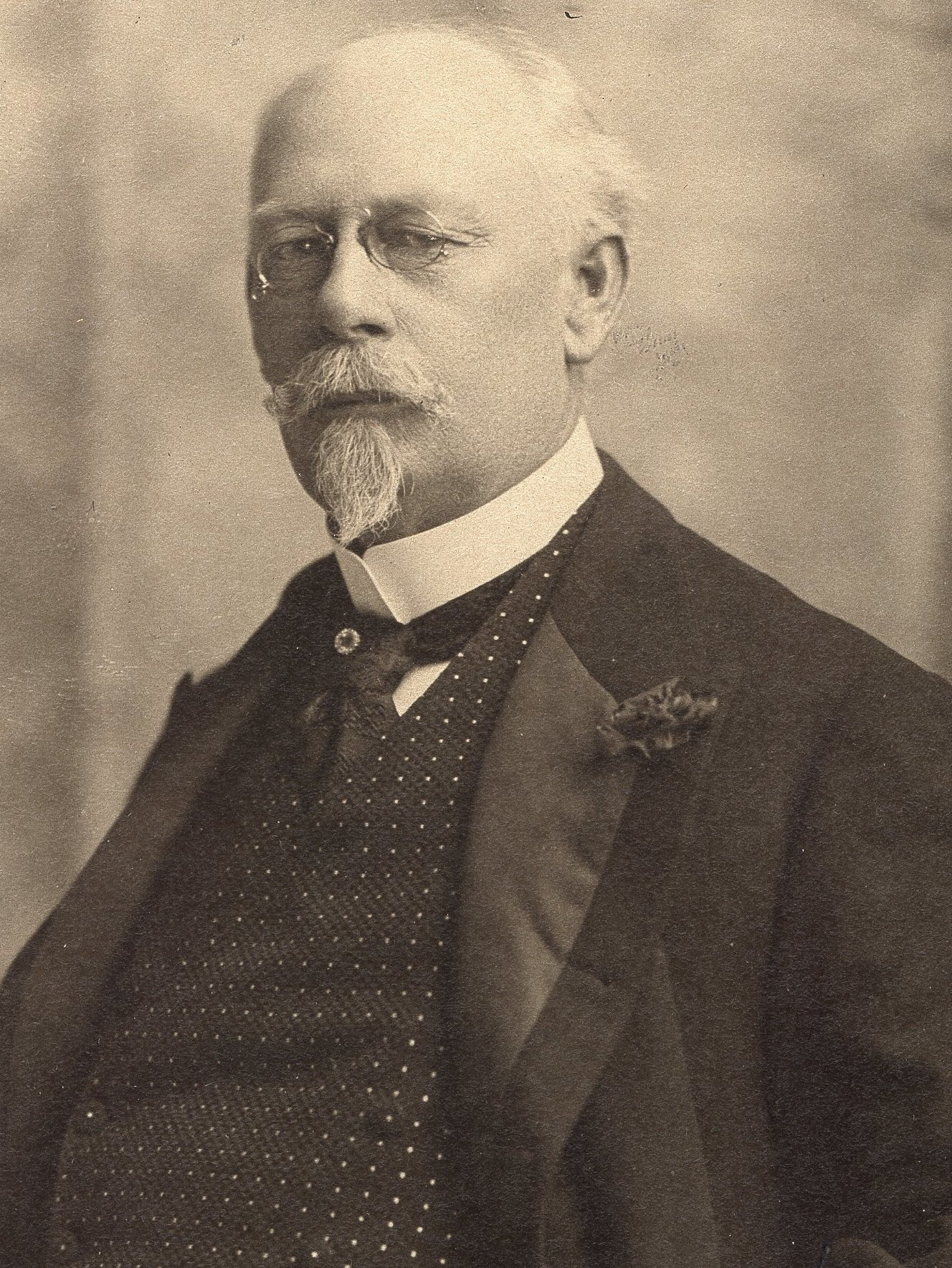

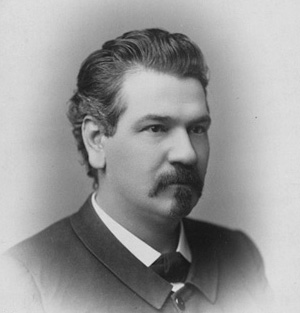
Nominee	William H. Upham	George Wilbur Peck	David Frank Powell
Party	Republican	Democratic	Populist
Popular vote	196,150	142,250	25,604
Percentage	52.24%	37.89%	6.82%
- County results Upham : 40–50% 50–60% 60–70% 70–80% Peck : 40–50% 50–60% 60–70%
Governor before election
George Wilbur Peck
Democratic
Elected Governor
William H. Upham
Republican

The 1894 Wisconsin gubernatorial election was held on November 6, 1894.

Incumbent Democratic Governor George Wilbur Peck was soundly defeated by Republican nominee William H. Upham. This election ushered in a four decade period of Republican dominance in Wisconsin politics as the nation as a whole transitioned to the Fourth Party System after the Panic of 1893 and the ensuing collapse of the Democratic Party's national coalition.

== General election ==
=== Candidates ===
Major party candidates

- George Wilbur Peck, Democratic, incumbent Governor
- William H. Upham, Republican, former mayor of Marshfield

Other candidates

- Capt. John F. Cleghorn, Prohibition
- David Frank Powell, Labor, mayor of La Crosse, Union Labor nominee for Governor of Wisconsin in 1888

=== Results ===
1894 Wisconsin gubernatorial election
Party	Candidate	Votes	%	±%
Republican	William H. Upham	196,150	52.24%	+6.36%
Democratic	George W. Peck (incumbent)	142,250	37.89%	−10.04%
Populist	D. Frank Powell	25,604	6.82%	+4.23%
Prohibition	John F. Cleghorn	11,240	2.99%	−0.55%
	Scattering	7	0.00%	
	Blank	198	0.05%	
Majority		53,900	14.36%	
Total votes		375,449	100.00%	
Republican gain from Democratic		Swing	+16.40%	

=== Results by county ===
Upham was the first Republican to ever win Brown County and Oneida County and the first since 1869 to win Sheboygan County. This would be the last election until 1932 in which Outagamie County voted for a Democrat. By voting for Upham, St. Croix County began a streak of 40 consecutive gubernatorial elections, lasting until 1978, in which it voted for the winning candidate.

County	William H. Upham Republican		George W. Peck Democratic		D. Frank Powell Populist		John F. Cleghorn Prohibition		Margin		Total votes cast
County	#	%	#	%	#	%	#	%	#	%	Total votes cast
Adams	1,129	74.87%	332	22.02%	29	1.92%	18	1.19%	797	52.85%	1,508
Ashland	1,722	48.22%	1,525	42.71%	210	5.88%	114	3.19%	197	5.52%	3,571
Barron	1,924	60.91%	589	18.65%	436	13.80%	209	6.62%	1,335	42.26%	3,159 (Note: Includes 1 Scattering vote)
Bayfield	1,514	59.56%	776	30.53%	115	4.52%	137	5.39%	738	29.03%	2,542
Brown	3,581	48.68%	3,464	47.09%	138	1.88%	173	2.35%	117	1.59%	7,356
Buffalo	1,776	54.46%	1,170	35.88%	267	8.19%	48	1.47%	606	18.58%	3,261
Burnett	602	69.84%	38	4.41%	173	20.07%	49	5.68%	564	65.43%	862
Calumet	1,025	37.85%	1,526	56.35%	118	4.36%	39	1.44%	-501	-18.50%	2,708
Chippewa	2,624	48.82%	2,082	38.73%	547	10.18%	122	2.27%	542	10.08%	5,375
Clark	2,361	60.54%	1,283	32.90%	134	3.44%	122	3.13%	1,078	27.64%	3,900
Columbia	3,802	55.64%	2,472	36.18%	246	3.60%	313	4.58%	1,330	19.46%	6,833
Crawford	1,911	55.34%	1,414	40.95%	111	3.21%	17	0.49%	497	14.39%	3,453
Dane	7,876	52.69%	5,886	39.38%	412	2.76%	774	5.18%	1,990	13.31%	14,948
Dodge	3,400	34.82%	6,084	62.31%	113	1.16%	167	1.71%	-2,684	-27.49%	9,764
Door	1,940	65.04%	932	31.24%	58	1.94%	53	1.78%	1,008	33.79%	2,983
Douglas	2,910	55.48%	1,323	25.22%	796	15.18%	216	4.12%	1,587	30.26%	5,245
Dunn	2,470	60.09%	844	20.52%	601	14.61%	197	4.79%	1,628	39.57%	4,114
Eau Claire	3,146	53.33%	2,076	35.19%	282	4.78%	395	6.70%	1,070	18.14%	5,899
Florence	392	68.17%	113	19.65%	64	11.13%	6	1.04%	279	48.52%	575
Fond du Lac	4,818	48.71%	4,618	46.69%	217	2.19%	238	2.41%	200	2.02%	9,891
Forest	358	56.03%	263	41.16%	14	2.19%	4	0.63%	95	14.87%	639
Grant	4,519	55.56%	3,187	39.18%	151	1.86%	277	3.41%	1,332	16.38%	8,134
Green	2,351	50.56%	1,695	36.45%	338	7.27%	264	5.68%	656	14.11%	4,650 (Note: Includes 2 Scattering votes)
Green Lake	1,694	51.36%	1,448	43.91%	70	2.12%	86	2.61%	246	7.46%	3,298
Iowa	2,651	50.86%	2,153	41.31%	63	1.21%	345	6.62%	498	9.55%	5,212
Iron	794	62.08%	446	34.87%	31	2.42%	8	0.63%	348	27.21%	1,279
Jackson	2,048	68.45%	787	26.30%	57	1.91%	100	3.34%	1,261	42.15%	2,992
Jefferson	2,989	41.31%	3,974	54.92%	62	0.86%	211	2.92%	-985	-13.61%	7,236
Juneau	2,330	54.44%	1,782	41.64%	70	1.64%	98	2.29%	548	12.80%	4,280
Kenosha	1,994	48.65%	1,670	40.74%	183	4.46%	54	1.32%	324	7.90%	4,099 (Note: Includes 198 Blank votes)
Kewaunee	1,086	34.48%	1,971	62.57%	72	2.29%	21	0.67%	-885	-28.10%	3,150
La Crosse	3,932	47.04%	2,767	33.10%	1,441	17.24%	219	2.62%	1,165	13.94%	8,359
Lafayette	2,560	52.15%	2,081	42.39%	83	1.69%	185	3.77%	479	9.76%	4,909
Langlade	1,116	48.10%	1,134	48.88%	41	1.77%	29	1.25%	-18	-0.78%	2,320
Lincoln	1,200	38.46%	1,279	40.99%	578	18.53%	63	2.02%	-79	-2.53%	3,120
Manitowoc	2,908	43.07%	3,473	51.44%	319	4.72%	52	0.77%	-565	-8.37%	6,752
Marathon	3,049	46.14%	3,272	49.52%	220	3.33%	67	1.01%	-223	-3.37%	6,608
Marinette	2,950	57.71%	1,839	35.97%	189	3.70%	134	2.62%	1,111	21.73%	5,112
Marquette	1,290	58.16%	868	39.13%	29	1.31%	31	1.40%	422	19.03%	2,218
Milwaukee	23,629	47.94%	15,384	31.21%	9,478	19.23%	798	1.62%	8,245	16.73%	49,289
Monroe	2,883	53.23%	2,225	41.08%	111	2.05%	197	3.64%	658	12.15%	5,416
Oconto	1,784	54.44%	1,355	41.35%	79	2.41%	59	1.80%	429	13.09%	3,277
Oneida	1,182	59.40%	601	30.20%	170	8.54%	37	1.86%	581	29.20%	1,990
Outagamie	3,738	45.87%	4,015	49.27%	152	1.87%	244	2.99%	-277	-3.40%	8,149
Ozaukee	886	30.34%	1,912	65.48%	110	3.77%	12	0.41%	-1,026	-35.14%	2,920
Pepin	988	67.07%	412	27.97%	29	1.97%	44	2.99%	576	39.10%	1,473
Pierce	2,556	67.03%	905	23.73%	169	4.43%	183	4.80%	1,651	43.30%	3,813
Polk	1,552	65.02%	475	19.90%	254	10.64%	106	4.44%	1,077	45.12%	2,387
Portage	2,717	48.46%	2,703	48.21%	72	1.28%	115	2.05%	14	0.25%	5,607
Price	1,061	59.61%	612	34.38%	68	3.82%	39	2.19%	449	25.22%	1,780
Racine	4,332	48.07%	2,870	31.85%	1,540	17.09%	270	3.00%	1,462	16.22%	9,012
Richland	2,392	56.62%	1,438	34.04%	182	4.31%	213	5.04%	954	22.58%	4,225
Rock	6,510	61.42%	3,445	32.50%	188	1.77%	457	4.31%	3,065	28.92%	10,600
Sauk	3,798	54.20%	2,841	40.55%	64	0.91%	304	4.34%	957	13.66%	7,007
Sawyer	366	43.36%	351	41.59%	49	5.81%	78	9.24%	15	1.78%	844
Shawano	1,762	46.85%	1,671	44.43%	271	7.21%	57	1.52%	91	2.42%	3,761
Sheboygan	4,459	48.09%	3,637	39.23%	1,070	11.54%	106	1.14%	822	8.87%	9,272
St. Croix	2,755	52.36%	2,006	38.12%	212	4.03%	289	5.49%	749	14.23%	5,262
Taylor	1,051	52.42%	769	38.35%	153	7.63%	32	1.60%	282	14.06%	2,005
Trempealeau	2,101	60.90%	1,009	29.25%	119	3.45%	221	6.41%	1,092	31.65%	3,450
Vernon	3,528	71.62%	979	19.87%	283	5.75%	133	2.70%	2,549	51.75%	4,926 (Note: Includes 3 Scattering votes)
Vilas	721	50.03%	649	45.04%	47	3.26%	24	1.67%	72	5.00%	1,441
Walworth	4,145	66.14%	1,617	25.80%	104	1.66%	401	6.40%	2,528	40.34%	6,267
Washburn	551	56.57%	348	35.73%	60	6.16%	15	1.54%	203	20.84%	974
Washington	2,135	46.42%	2,409	52.38%	41	0.89%	14	0.30%	-274	-5.96%	4,599
Waukesha	4,337	53.95%	3,260	40.55%	176	2.19%	265	3.30%	1,077	13.40%	8,039
Waupaca	3,909	64.96%	1,755	29.16%	69	1.15%	285	4.74%	2,154	35.79%	6,018
Waushara	2,396	78.10%	474	15.45%	39	1.27%	159	5.18%	1,922	62.65%	3,068
Winnebago	6,536	54.80%	3,964	33.23%	1,056	8.85%	372	3.12%	2,572	21.56%	11,928
Wood	2,646	61.02%	1,523	35.12%	111	2.56%	56	1.29%	1,123	25.90%	4,336
Total	196,150	52.24%	142,250	37.89%	25,604	6.82%	11,240	2.99%	53,900	14.36%	375,449

==== Counties that flipped from Democratic to Republican ====
- Ashland
- Brown
- Chippewa
- Dane
- Fond du Lac
- Forest
- Green Lake
- Iowa
- Juneau
- Kenosha
- La Crosse
- Marinette
- Marquette
- Oconto
- Oneida
- Portage
- Shawano
- Sheboygan
- Taylor
- Waukesha
- Winnebago
- Wood

== Bibliography ==
- Glashan, Roy R. (1979). American Governors and Gubernatorial Elections, 1775-1978. Meckler Books. ISBN 0-930466-17-9.
- Gubernatorial Elections, 1787-1997. Washington, D.C.: Congressional Quarterly Inc. 1998. ISBN 1-56802-396-0.
- Casson, Henry, ed. (1895). The Blue Book of the state of Wisconsin. The Milwaukee Litho. & Engr. Co.
