= National Dairy Shrine =

American dairy industry history organization

- National Dairy Shrine
- Formation: 1949
- Location: United States
- Coordinates: 42.9236743°N 88.8353362°W
- Members: 18,000
- Website: dairyshrine.org

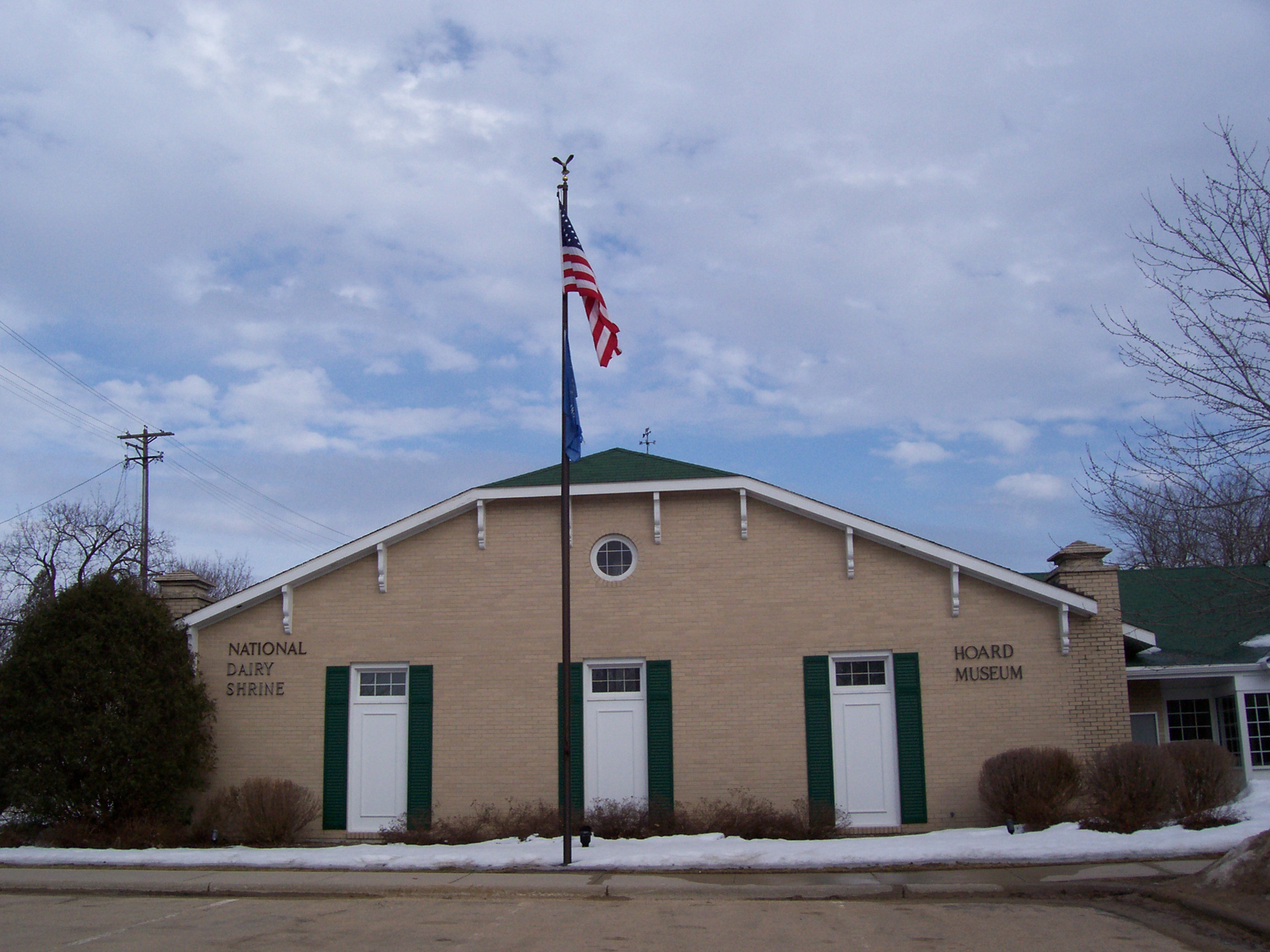
National Dairy Shrine museum

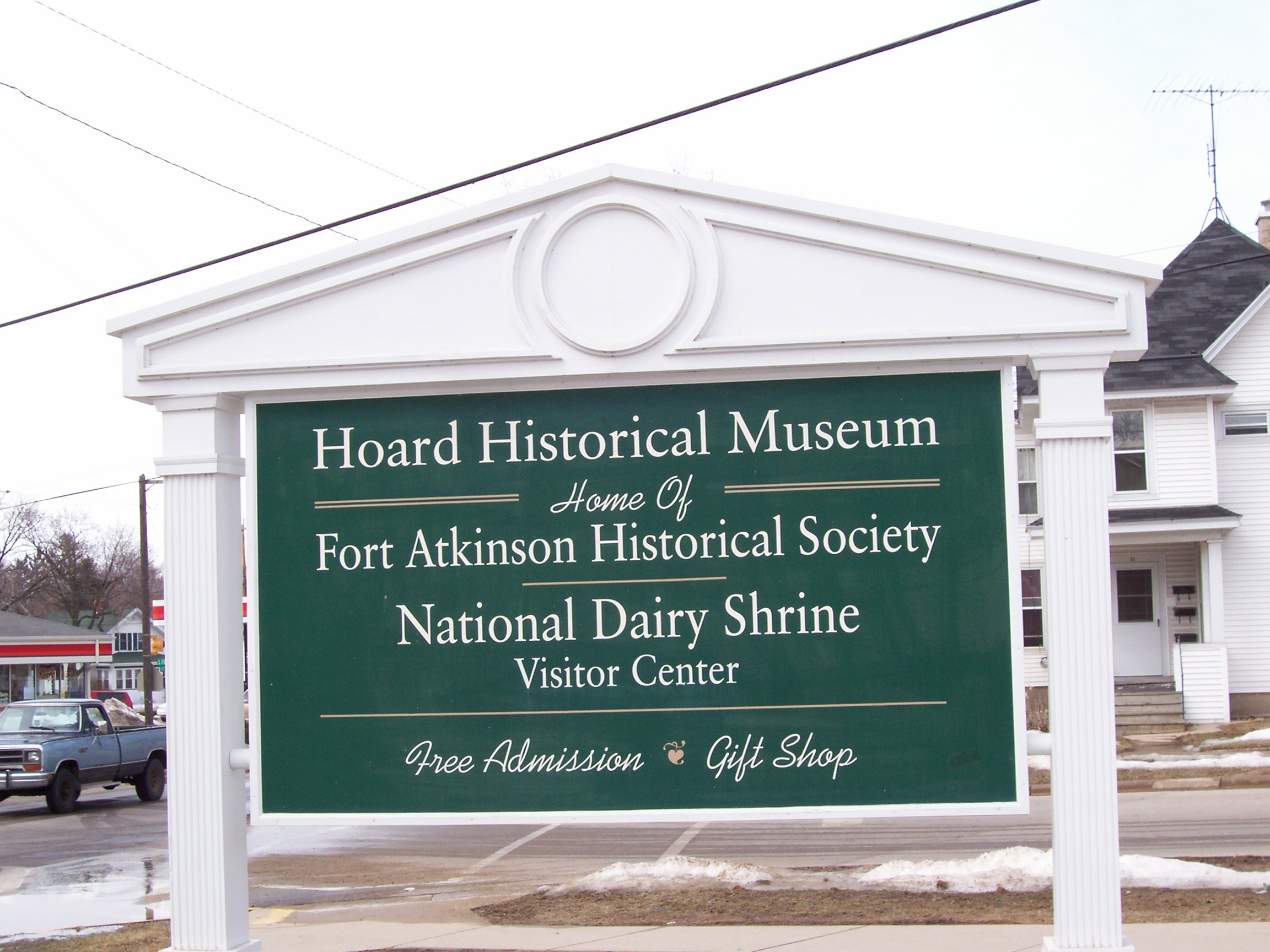
Welcome sign

The National Dairy Shrine is an American dairying group founded in 1949 and based in Wisconsin. The shrine promotes the dairy industry and records its history. As of 2007, the organization had over 18,000 members from most facets of dairying. It holds an annual ceremony where it inducts members of the dairy industry into its hall of fame.

== Hoard Historical Museum ==
The National Dairy Shrine's museum is located in Fort Atkinson, Wisconsin. It shares a visitor center with the Hoard Historical Museum, which was William D. Hoard's house. Hoard, Wisconsin's 16th governor, was a prominent dairy advocate though his weekly publication, Hoard's Dairyman.

The National Dairy Shrine's museum contains exhibits about the history of dairying. Dairying objects in its collection include butter churns, milking machines, a treadle, and items used in the Babcock test for fat content of milk, which was developed nearby at the University of Wisconsin–Madison.

The Hoard Historical Museum focuses on local history. Permanent exhibits include mounted bird dioramas, Native American artifacts, Sauk chief Black Hawk and the 1832 Black Hawk War, local poet Lorine Niedecker, quilts and antique clothing, and the mid-19th century period Foster House. One exhibit focuses on Abraham Lincoln and his activities in the area when he was a young man.

The museums are operated by the Fort Atkinson Historical Society.

== Inductees ==
=== Pioneers ===
- Aitken, David D.
- Babcock, Stephen M.
- Bakewell, Robert
- Bang, Bernhard L. F.
- Borden, Gail
- De Laval, Karl Gustav
- Eckles, Clarence H.
- Stuart, Elbridge A.
- Fraser, Wilber J.
- Haecker, Theophilus L.
- Hoard, William D.
- Hunziker, Otto F.
- Latzer, Louis
- Mendel, Gregor J.
- Morrill, Justin S.
- Pasteur, Louis
- Trout, G. Malcolm

== See also ==
- Merchants Avenue Historic District
