= Merchants Avenue Historic District =

Historic district in Wisconsin, United States

- U.S. National Register of Historic Places
- U.S. Historic district
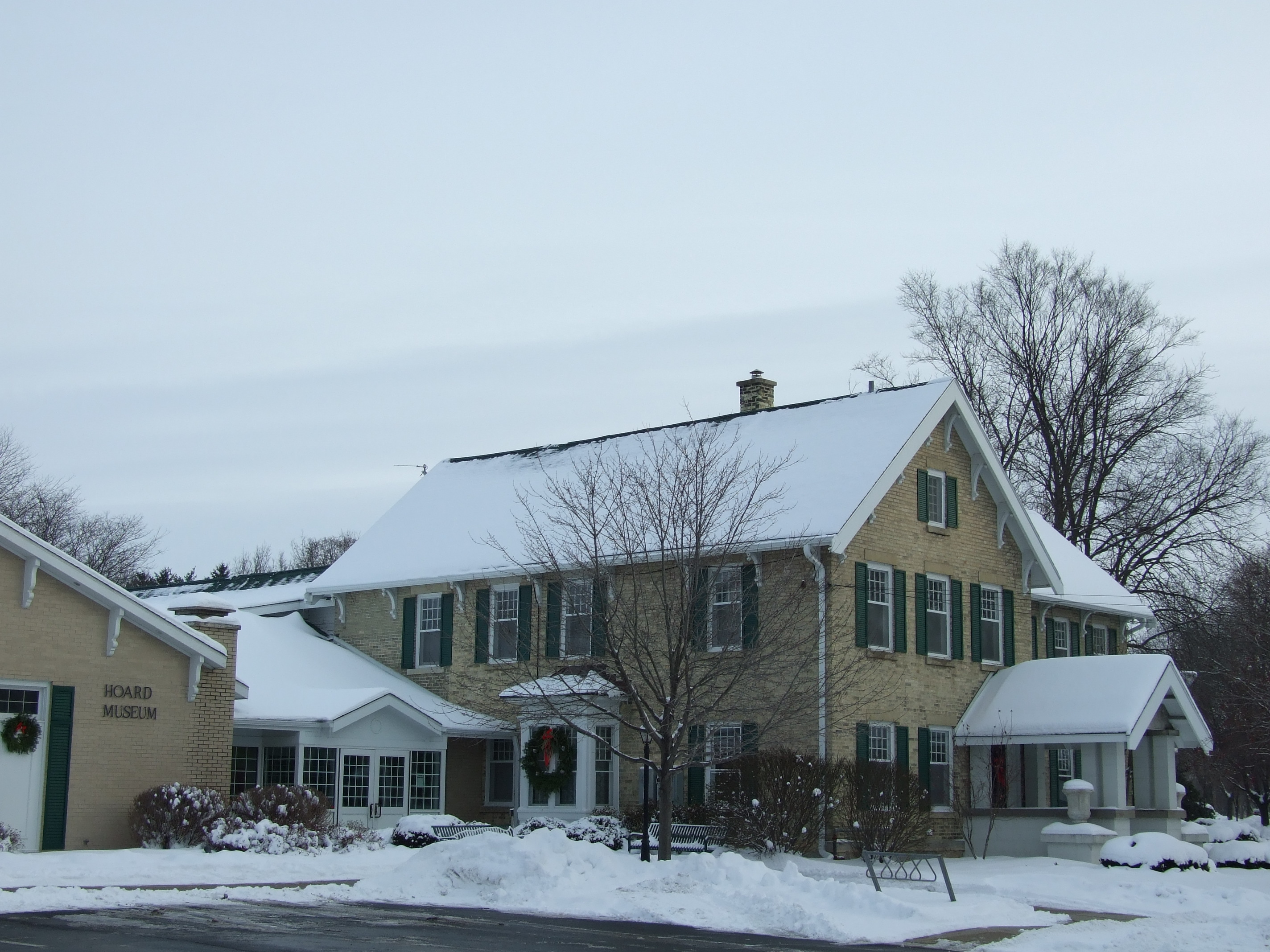
- Hoard Museum

- Location within Wisconsin Location within the United States
- Location: Roughly bounded by S. Third St. E and S. Milwaukee Ave. E, Foster St., Whitewater, and Merchant Aves
- Nearest city: Fort Atkinson, Wisconsin
- Coordinates: 42°55′27″N 88°50′6″W
- NRHP reference No.: 86001303
- Added to NRHP: June 13, 1986

The Merchants Avenue Historic District in a residential neighborhood southeast of the downtown in Fort Atkinson, Wisconsin, composed of 33 mostly large homes on large lots within six city blocks around Merchants Avenue. It was placed on the United States National Register of Historic Places in 1986.

== History ==
Because of its proximity to the Main Street mercantile area, Merchants Avenue became a natural residential location for many businessmen and professionals. Home designs were influenced by the Gilded Age attitude toward architecture. This resulted in many different architectural styles used in the district, including Greek Revival, Italianate, Second Empire, Queen Anne and Spanish Colonial. The predominant building materials used were either the locally manufactured yellow brick or wood, framed into houses with clapboard walls and shingled roofs.

== Notable buildings ==
These are some of the notable buildings in the district, listed in the general order built. The procession of architectural styles is similar to the rest of southern Wisconsin.

- The Dwight Foster house at 414 Foster Street is Fort Atkinson's oldest frame house. It was built in 1841 by Charles Rockwell and sold to Foster a few years later. The house has a simple gabled-ell form with Greek Revival style frieze and cornice returns. In the early years Foster used the house as an inn and post office. It was first built on Main Street, but later moved to its current site at the Hoard Museum. The lumber used was floated down the Rock River from Watertown. Wooden pegs are used throughout and it has cherry cellar stairs.
- The Peter Craig house at 513 Foster St. is a cottage built of cream brick in 1855. Its style is Gothic Revival, characterized by the steep roof, the delicate brackets, and symmetry.
- The Arthur R. Hoard House at 323 Merchants Ave is the most elaborate building in the district. It was built between 1853 and 1865 for George P. Marston as a 2-story Italianate house, then expanded and restyled as Queen Anne in 1898 by Hoard.
- The Joseph Winslow house at 109 S. Third St is a small, Second Empire-style house built in 1861 with a central front tower.
- The Hoard Historical Museum at 407 Merchants Avenue was built in 1864 for merchant Reuben White, a two-story brick house with Gothic Revival brackets under the eaves. A wing was added in 1875 and in 1906 Frank Hoard doubled the size of the building and renovated it with an Arts and Crafts motif. The Hoard family donated the building to the city in 1956 for use as a museum. Since then three major additions have been added, including the National Dairy Shrine in 1981.
- The M.H. Ganong house at 332 Merchants Ave is a fine 2-story cream brick Italianate home built 1871–73, with broad eaves, oculus windows, and other windows with carved hood molds. Ganong was a prominent merchant, ran a stagecoach line, and served as mayor and postmaster. In the 1930s Harriet Hoard Becker remodeled the house.
- The Frank Allen house at 507 Foster is another 2-story cream brick Italianate house with wide eaves and hood molds above the windows, built in 1876 with a 2-story bay window on its south side.
- The Horace Willard/Della & Chester Caswell house at 303 Merchants Ave is a two-story house with a Second Empire-styled mansard roof built in 1881. Otherwise it is rather like the Italianate houses above, with cream brick walls, hood molds above the windows, and a two-story bay window. The home is accompanied by a mansard-roofed garage. Horace Willard, a physician, had it built for his daughter Della and her husband Chester Caswell, who was a banker.
- The George Klein house at 500 Whitewater Ave is a 2.5-story house with a somewhat Craftsman style and a carriage house out back.
- The Herbert Vickery house at 430 Whitewater Ave is a 2.5-story late Queen Anne-styled house built in 1908 for Vickery, a merchant. Hallmarks of the style are its asymmetry, the corner tower, and the complex hip roof. A 2-story horse barn sites toward the back of the lot.
- The O.W. Donkle house at 506 Whitewater Ave is a 2.5-story house built in 1910 for Donkle, a cashier at Fort Atkinson Savings Bank. The general massing and varied textures are Queen-Anne-ish. The Palladian windows, returned eaves, and pediment in the front porch are Classical Revival details, which is a typical mix for late Queen Anne.
- St. Peter's Episcopal Church at 302 Merchants Ave is a Spanish Colonial Revival church built in 1928. It has a stucco exterior, buttresses, and a stylized bell tower. The church was designed by Eschweiler and Eschweiler of Milwaukee.

== See also ==
- Main Street Historic District
- National Register of Historic Places listings in Jefferson County, Wisconsin
