= Upham Mansion =

Historic house in Wisconsin, United States

- U.S. Historic district – Contributing property
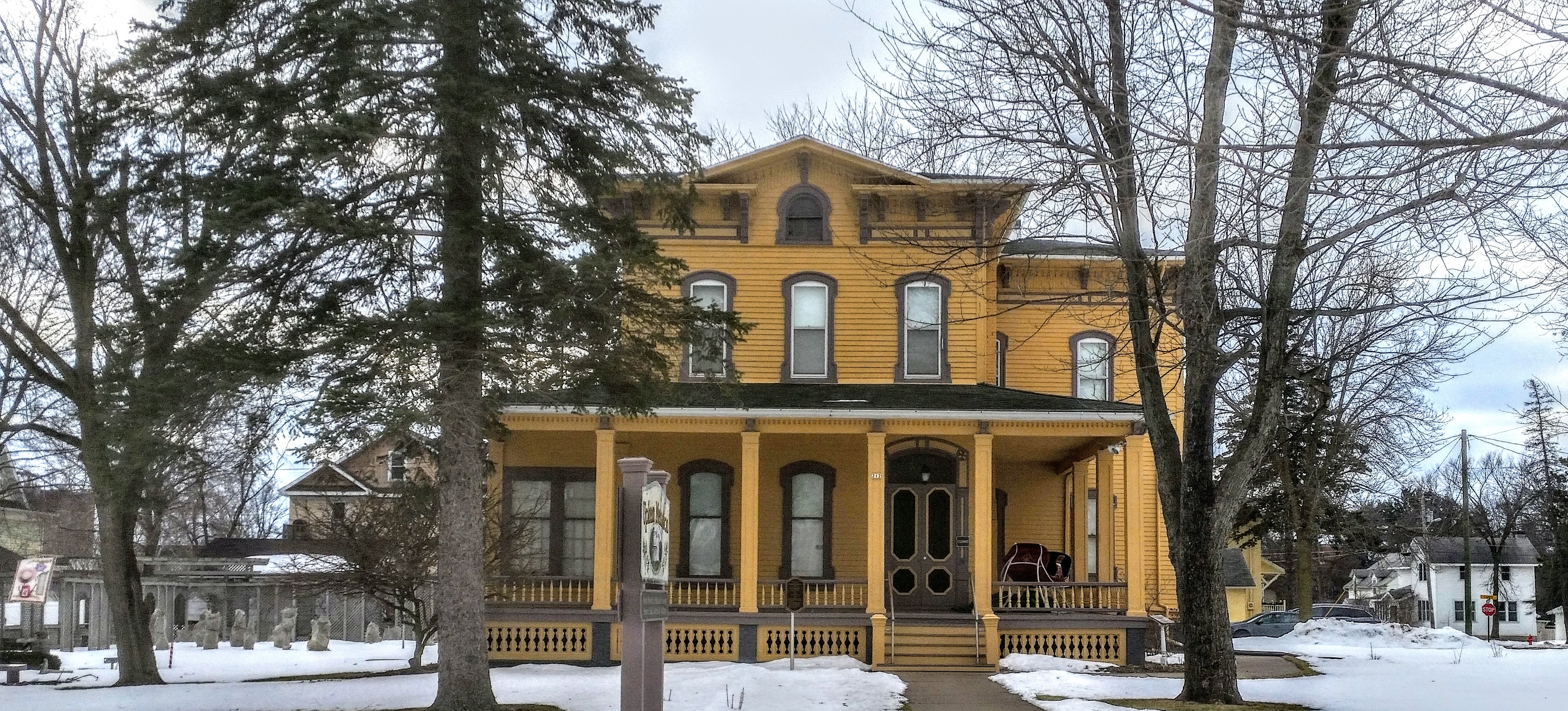

- Location within Wisconsin Location within the United States
- Interactive map showing the location of Upham Mansion
- Location: 212 West Third Street, Marshfield, Wisconsin
- Coordinates: 44°39′56″N 90°10′40″W
- Architectural style: mid-Victorian, Italianate
- Part of: Upham House Historic District (ID08000753)
- Designated CP: July 30, 2008

Upham Mansion also known as Gov. William H. Upham House at 212 West Third Street, Marshfield, Wisconsin, is the former family home of Wisconsin governor William H. Upham. The house is now a museum and lies in the NRHP registered Upham House Historic District. The mansion is Italiante style, constructed in 1880.

The furnishings of the house are mainly the original family furnishings, other items are of a matching, Victorian, vintage. Many are products of Upham's furniture business. Notable is an engraving of Lincoln reading the Emancipation Proclamation presented to Upham by the subject. Also of note is a Shimmeger harp sent to Chicago to be assembled and rescued from the Chicago fire.

== North Wood County Historical Society ==
The house and museum are maintained by the North Wood Historical Society, which meets in the house monthly. Open tours are held twice weekly.

== Heritage Rose Garden and New Garden ==
The Heritage Rose Garden contains 32 historic rose types mostly dated from the fifteenth to early twentieth centuries - such as the Apothecary's Rose, some much older, and additional seven types in the New Garden. The only Hybrid Tea Dainty Bess is the most modern rose in the garden. There are two damask roses, Celisana and the Rose of Castile.

=== New Garden roses ===
As of 2010 the New Garden has Austrian copper (a foeteda), Four seasons' rose (Autumn damask), Banshee, Williams Double Yellow, La Belle Sultane, Armidae and Fantin Latour. The Austrian copper is the oldest of these, dating from 1590.
