= William H. Upham =

18th Governor of Wisconsin

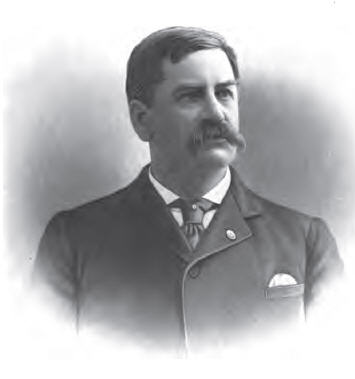

18th Governor of Wisconsin
- In office January 7, 1895 – January 4, 1897
- Lieutenant: Emil Baensch
- Preceded by: George Wilbur Peck
- Succeeded by: Edward Scofield

3rd & 6th Mayor of Marshfield, Wisconsin
- In office April 1891 – April 1892
- Preceded by: L. A. Arnold
- Succeeded by: Henry Kalsched
- In office April 1886 – April 1888
- Preceded by: W. H. Budge
- Succeeded by: Adam Hafer

Member of the Marshfield City Council
- In office April 1883 – April 1886

Personal details
- Born: May 3, 1841 Westminster, Massachusetts, US
- Died: July 2, 1924 (aged 83) Marshfield, Wisconsin, US
- Resting place: Hillside Cemetery, Marshfield, Wisconsin
- Party: Republican
- Spouses: Mary Cornelia Kelley; (died 1912); Grace Wilson Mason; (died 1975)
- Children: 3
- Relatives: Calvin H. Upham (brother)

Military service
- Allegiance: United States
- Branch/service: United States Volunteers; Union Army; United States Army
- Years of service: 1861–1862 (USV); 1866–1869 (USA)
- Rank: Corporal, USV; 1st Lieutenant, USA
- Unit: 2nd Reg. Wis. Vol. Infantry; 4th Reg. U.S. Artillery
- Battles/wars: American Civil War: Manassas campaign; Battle of Blackburn's Ford; First Battle of Bull Run

William Henry Upham (May 3, 1841 – July 2, 1924) was an American businessman, politician, and Wisconsin pioneer. He was the 18th governor of Wisconsin and served three terms as mayor of Marshfield, Wisconsin. He is the namesake of Upham, Wisconsin, in Langlade County.

== Biography ==
Upham was born in Westminster, Massachusetts, and moved to Niles, Michigan around 1852 and then Kenosha, Wisconsin, in 1853. He graduated from Racine High School in Racine, Wisconsin, the first public school in Wisconsin.

== Military service ==
At the outbreak of the American Civil War, he joined up with the "Belle City Rifles", a Racine militia company, for service in the Union Army. His company was enrolled as Company F of the 2nd Wisconsin Infantry Regiment.

Just a few months after starting his service, he was wounded during the First Battle of Bull Run by a bullet passing through his shoulder strap that supported his cartridge box just at the shoulder blade. After going to the field hospital, he was captured by Confederate forces and sent to the converted tobacco barn, Libby Prison, along with other members of his company—F. Lacy, James Anderson, John H. Anderson, and Antle Henry. Congressman Alfred Ely from New York was captured along with them.

At Libby Prison, he was attended by Dr. Lewis, the 2nd Wisconsin's surgeon. His family in Wisconsin, however, was told that he had been killed in action and held a funeral for him in Racine, Wisconsin—the captain of his company, William E. Strong, had seen him shot and reported that he believed him to be dead.

Upham was released in a prisoner exchange in 1862 and repatriated to Washington, D.C., where he was introduced to President Abraham Lincoln at a White House interview arranged by Wisconsin Senator James Rood Doolittle. Soon after, Lincoln appointed Upham to the United States Military Academy in West Point, New York, from which he graduated in 1866. Upham was commissioned as a 2nd Lieutenant in the artillery and served in the Army until November 1869, having been promoted to the rank of first lieutenant in March of the same year.

While stationed at Fort Monroe, he was detailed as officer of the guard, overseeing the temporary quarters of the then-imprisoned President of the Confederate States of America, Jefferson Davis. In his memoirs, Upham related that he and Davis "usually ... past the hours until after midnight" in conversation, adding, "Mr. Davis was very pleasant and social ... full of reminiscences ... familiar with all parts of Wisconsin, he could tell me the meanings of all the Indian names of the [state]." Later in his life, Upham was a Grand Army of the Republic officer with the rank of major.

== Postbellum career ==
After returning from military service, Upham first resided at Kewaunee, Wisconsin. In 1878, he and his brother, Charles, moved to Marshfield, Wisconsin, where they built the city's first sawmill. The Uphams flourished in the lumber industry, and his company, the Upham Manufacturing Company, came to own several businesses in the Marshfield area, including a shingle mill, grist mill, and furniture factory. In 1880, he constructed his family home, now known as the Gov. William H. Upham House and featured in the National Register of Historic Places.

Upham became one of the most prominent residents of Marshfield in the era and was elected Mayor for three years, in 1886, 1887, and 1891. On June 27, 1887, a major fire started at Upham's lumber mill and spread across all of Marshfield, destroying 250 buildings—virtually the entire city. Upham led reconstruction efforts and saw the city return to prosperity.

In 1894, Upham was the Republican Party of Wisconsin's nominee for Governor against incumbent Democrat George Wilbur Peck. Upham won the election and became the 18th Governor of Wisconsin in January 1895. He served one term but did not seek re-election in 1896. Upham instead tended to his business interests in Marshfield, as President of Upham Manufacturing and the Water, Electric Light and Power Co.

Upham retired from business in 1919 and spent much of his later years in Florida. He died of pneumonia in Marshfield, Wisconsin, on July 2, 1924.

He was an original Companion (#03124) of the Military Order of the Loyal Legion of the United States, or the MOLLUS, founded in 1865 by and for commissioned officers who had served in the Union forces in the Civil War. His son William Jr. (1916-2009) served as Commander-in-Chief of the Order from 1985 to 1989.

The town of Upham, Wisconsin, is named for him.

== Personal life and family ==
William H. Upham was the youngest son of Alvin Upham and his wife Sarah (née Derby). His grandfather, Jonathan Upham, was a soldier in the Continental Army during the American Revolutionary War and was present at the surrender of Yorktown. The Uphams were direct descendants of John Upham, an English colonist who came to the Massachusetts Bay Colony in 1635, and was one of the first settlers of Weymouth, Massachusetts.

William had several siblings, who also emigrated from the northeast to Wisconsin, including Calvin H. Upham, who served in the Wisconsin State Assembly.

William H. Upham married twice. Some two years after the death of his first wife, Mary Kelly, in 1912, Upham, then 73, undertook a voyage along the Atlantic coast, that was forced by storm to harbor at Beaufort, North Carolina. There he met and married his much younger second wife, Grace Mason, and begat two sons: William H. Upham Jr., (who was a member of Milwaukee Yacht Club until his death), and Frederick M. Upham, who survived his older sibling.

On August 20, 2009, at age 93, William H. Upham Jr., died in his home in Milwaukee, Wisconsin, due to pneumonia. On December 30, 2018, at age 97, Frederick M. Upham died in Fort Collins, Colorado.

== Electoral history ==
Wisconsin Gubernatorial Election, 1894
Party	Candidate	Votes	%	±%
General Election, November 6, 1894
Republican	William H. Upham	196,150	52.24%	+6.36%
Democratic	George Wilbur Peck (incumbent)	142,250	37.89%	−10.04%
Populist	D. Frank Powell	25,604	6.82%	
Prohibition	John F. Cleghorn	11,240	2.99%	−0.55%
	Scattering	205	0.05%	
Total votes		'375,449'	'100.0%'	+1.05%
Republican gain from Democratic				

== See also ==
- Upham Mansion

Party political offices
Preceded by John Coit Spooner	Republican nominee for Governor of Wisconsin; 1894	Succeeded by Edward Scofield
Political offices
Preceded by George W. Peck	Governor of Wisconsin; 1895 – 1897	Succeeded by Edward Scofield
