= 10th and Cass Streets Neighborhood Historic District =

Historic district in Wisconsin, United States

- U.S. National Register of Historic Places
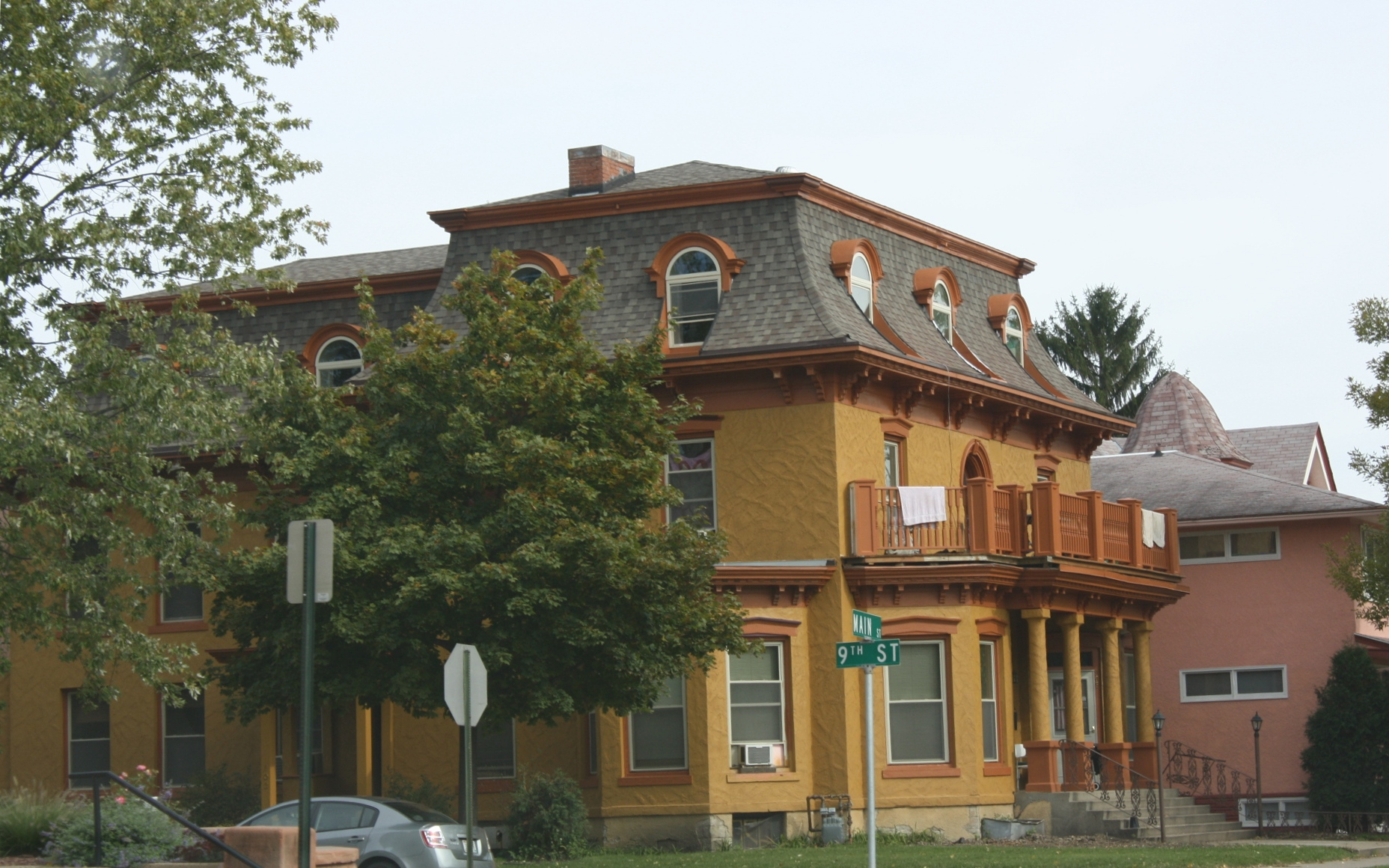
- A house located in the district.
- Location: Roughly bounded by Main St., S. 11th St., Cameron Ave., and S 8th St., La Crosse, Wisconsin
- Area: 12.6 acres (5.1 ha)
- NRHP reference No.: 00001534
- Added to NRHP: December 13, 2000

The 10th and Cass Streets Neighborhood Historic District is located in La Crosse, Wisconsin.

== Description ==
The district is made up of a residential neighborhood, including many of the earliest elaborate homes in the city. These include the 1859 Italianate Laverty-Martindale house, the 1871 Italian Villa-styled Webb-Withee house, the 1874 Italianate Governor George Peck house, the 1884 Stick style Frank Burton house, the 1886 Queen Anne Crosby house, and the 1914 Prairie style Kinnear house.
