= George Wilbur Peck =

American politician (1840–1916)

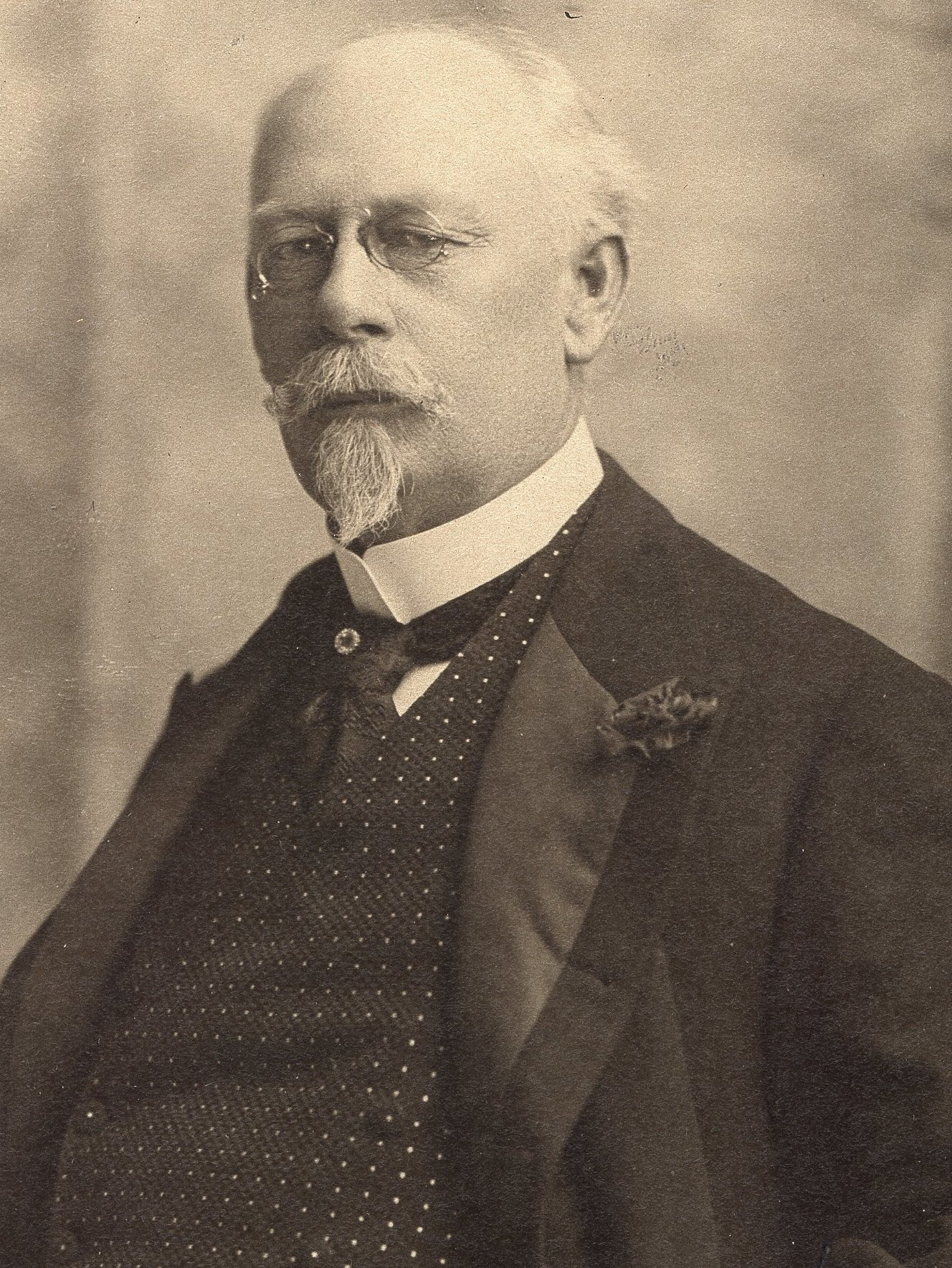

17th Governor of Wisconsin
- In office January 5, 1891 – January 7, 1895
- Lieutenant: Charles Jonas
- Preceded by: William D. Hoard
- Succeeded by: William H. Upham

29th Mayor of Milwaukee
- In office April 1890 – November 11, 1890
- Preceded by: Thomas H. Brown
- Succeeded by: Peter J. Somers

Personal details
- Born: September 28, 1840 Henderson, New York, U.S.
- Died: April 16, 1916 (aged 75) Milwaukee, Wisconsin, U.S.
- Resting place: Forest Home Cemetery, Milwaukee
- Party: Democratic
- Spouse: Francena Rowley Peck
- Parents: David B. Peck (father); Alzina P. (Joslin) Peck (mother)
- Education: Union College
- Profession: Writer politician

Military service
- Allegiance: United States
- Branch/service: United States Army; Union Army
- Years of service: 1863–1866
- Rank: 2nd Lieutenant
- Unit: 4th Reg. Wis. Vol. Cavalry
- Battles/wars: American Civil War

George Wilbur Peck (September 28, 1840 – April 16, 1916) was an American writer and politician from Wisconsin. He served as the 17th governor of Wisconsin and the 29th mayor of Milwaukee.

== Biography ==
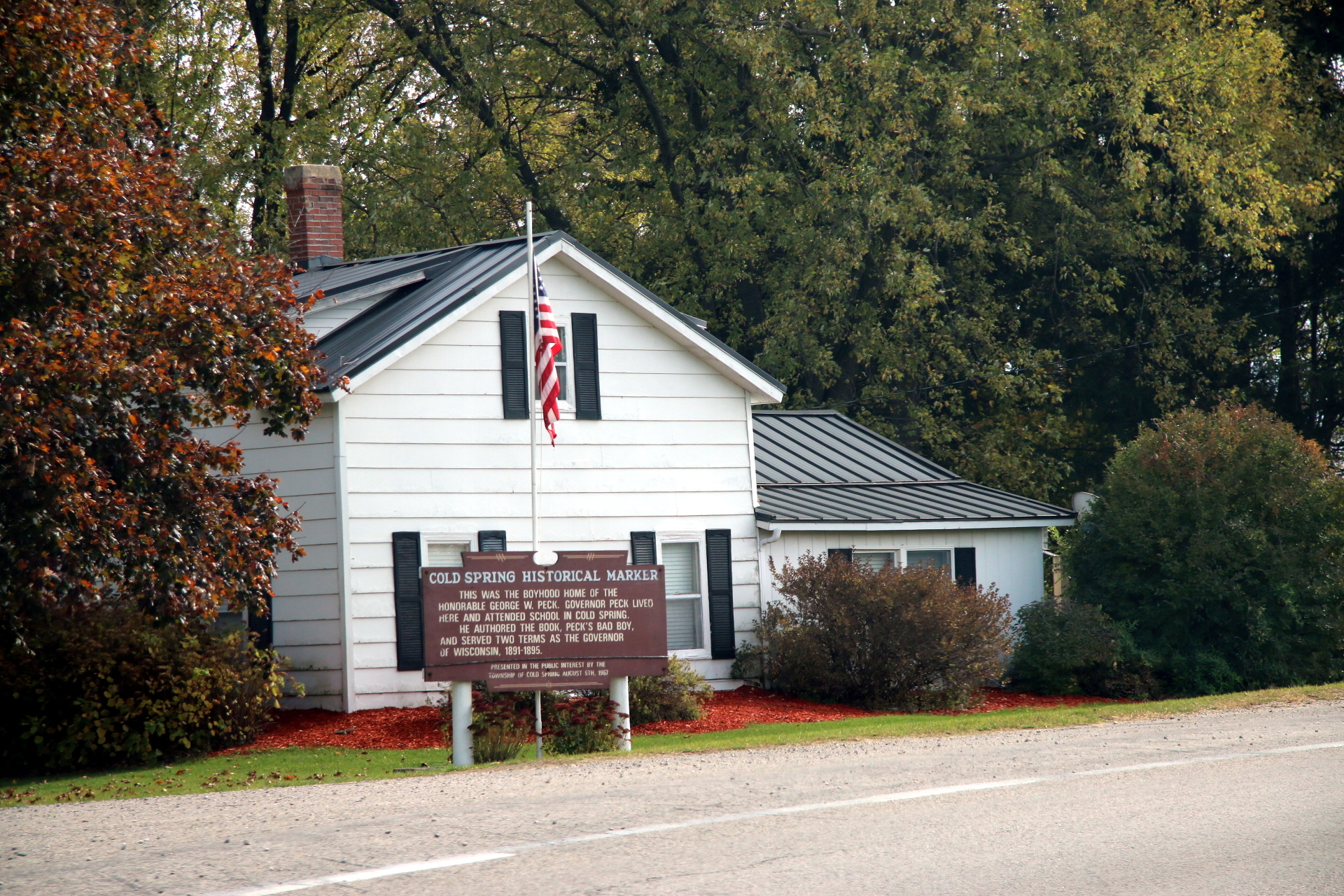
Peck's childhood home in Cold Spring

Peck was born in 1840 in Henderson, New York, the oldest of three children of David B. and Alzina P. (Joslin) Peck. In 1843, the family moved to what is now Cold Spring, Wisconsin. Peck attended public school until age 15 when he was apprenticed in the printing trade. He married Francena Rowley in 1860 and they had two sons. In 1863 he enlisted in the 4th Wisconsin Cavalry Regiment as a private. He was taken prisoner and held at Libby Prison in Richmond, Virginia. After he was released in a prisoner exchange, he was appointed to the United States Military Academy by Abraham Lincoln. He was promoted to lieutenant and served until the regiment mustered out in 1866.

Peck became a newspaper publisher who founded newspapers in Ripon and La Crosse, Wisconsin. His La Crosse newspaper, The Sun, was founded in 1874. In 1878 Peck moved the newspaper to Milwaukee, renaming it Peck's Sun. The weekly newspaper contained Peck's humorous writings, including his famous "Peck's Bad Boy" stories.

In the spring of 1890, Peck ran for mayor of Milwaukee. A Democrat, Peck was elected despite a Republican majority in the city. The state's Democratic leaders took notice and made Peck the party's nominee for the 1890 gubernatorial race. Peck won the election, beating the incumbent William Hoard, and resigned as Milwaukee's mayor on November 11, 1890. He was reelected as governor in 1892, defeating Republican John C. Spooner, but lost a third term to William Upham in 1894. He ran again in 1904 but lost to the incumbent Robert M. La Follette Sr.

Peck died in 1916 in Milwaukee at age 75 of Bright's disease and was buried at Forest Home Cemetery. After his death, his "Peck's Bad Boy" writings became the basis for several films and a short-lived television show, including Peck's Bad Boy and Peck's Bad Girl.

His former home in La Crosse is located in what is now known as the 10th and Cass Streets Neighborhood Historic District.

== Works ==
- Peck's Fun, 1879 (copy)
- Peck's Sunshine, 1882 (copy)
- Peck's Bad Boy and His Pa, 1883
- Will He Marry Her? A Domestic Drama for Home Reading, 1885
- How Private Geo. W. Peck Put Down the Rebellion, 1887 (copy)
- Pecks Irish Friend Phelan Geoheagan 1887
- Peck's Uncle Ike and the Red Headed Boy, 1899 (copy)
- Peck's Bad Boy Abroad, 1904 (copy)
- Peck's Bad Boy with the Circus, 1905 (copy)
- Peck's Bad Boy with the Cowboys, 1907
- Peck's Bad Boy in an Airship, 1908 (copy)

Peck's Bad Boy and the Groceryman 1883

Party political offices
Preceded by James Morgan	Democratic nominee for Governor of Wisconsin; 1890, 1892, 1894	Succeeded by Willis C. Silverthorn
Preceded by David Stuart Rose	Democratic nominee for Governor of Wisconsin; 1904	Succeeded by John A. Aylward
Political offices
Preceded by Thomas H. Brown	Mayor of Milwaukee; 1890	Succeeded by Peter J. Somers
Preceded by William D. Hoard	Governor of Wisconsin; 1891–1895	Succeeded by William H. Upham
