= Horace B. Willard =

American physician (1825–1900)

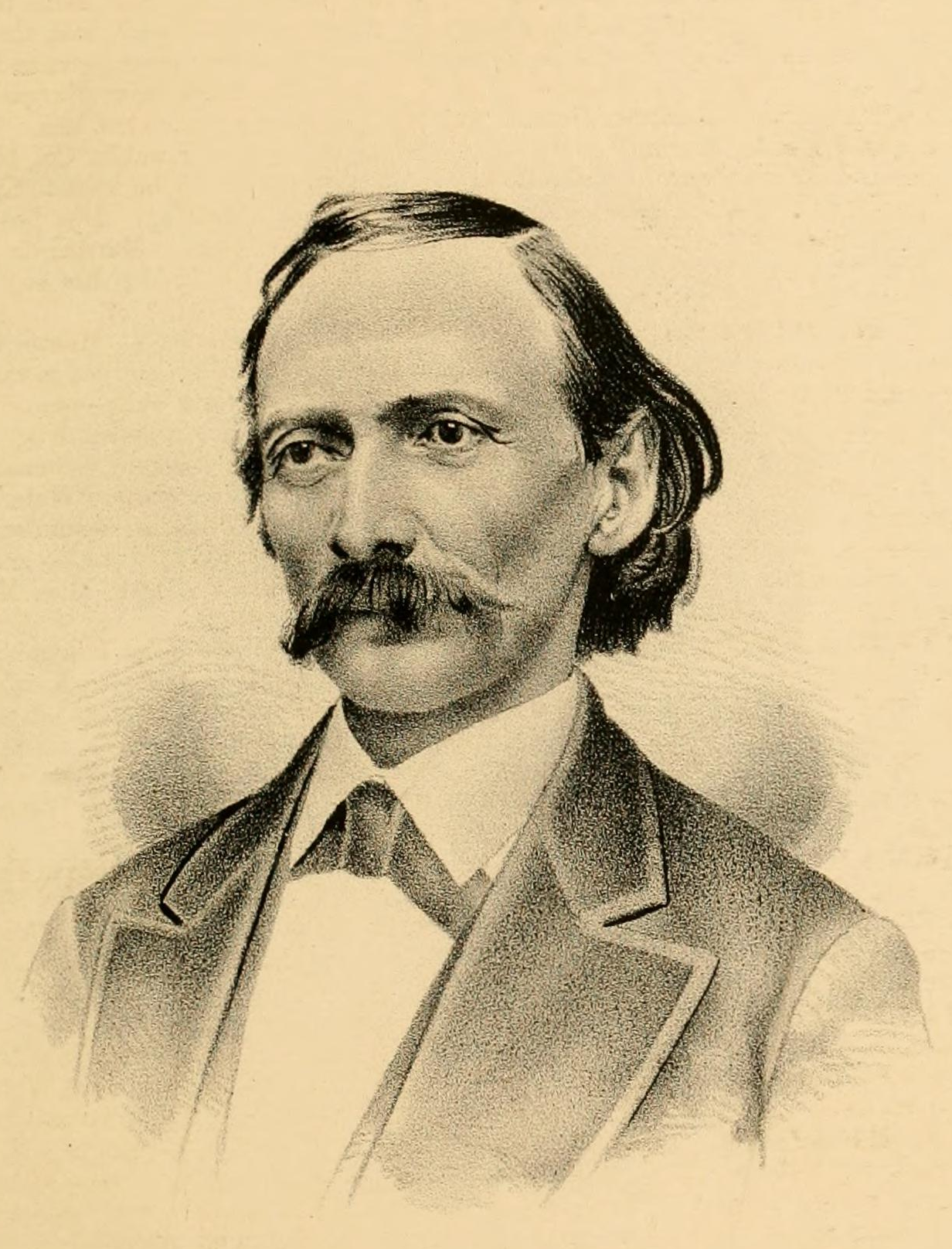
- Portrait from The History of Jefferson County, Wisconsin (1879)

Member of the Wisconsin State Assembly from the Jefferson 2nd district
- In office January 7, 1861 – January 6, 1862
- Preceded by: Charles Hammarquist
- Succeeded by: Walter S. Greene

Personal details
- Born: May 2, 1825 Volney, New York, U.S.
- Died: April 1, 1900 (aged 74) Fort Atkinson, Wisconsin, U.S.
- Resting place: Evergreen Cemetery, Fort Atkinson, Wisconsin
- Party: Republican

Horace Birney Willard (May 2, 1825 – April 1, 1900) was an American physician, businessman, politician and pioneer. He served one term in the Wisconsin State Assembly, representing Jefferson County.

== Biography ==
Horace Birney Willard was born in Volney, New York, on May 2, 1825. After studying in the public schools, Willard worked as a teacher. He studied medicine under William B. Coye in Gilbertsville, New York, then received a scholarship sponsored by the state. Willard attended the Geneva Medical College, graduating in 1849. He set out west, settling in Aztalan, Wisconsin, to practice medicine. After seven years, he sold his practice due to failing health. After a year of travel, Willard settled in Lake Mills, Wisconsin, in 1857, again practicing medicine. Poor health caused Willard to finally abandon medicine in 1866.

Willard remained in the county, settling in Fort Atkinson. There, Willard engaged in several commercial pursuits. He co-founded the Northwestern Manufacturing Company and served as one of its first directors. Willard was also bookkeeper, secretary, and stockholder in the Foundry and Machining Company. In partnership with N. F. Hopkins and F. M. Vickery, Willard opened the Willard & Co. store.

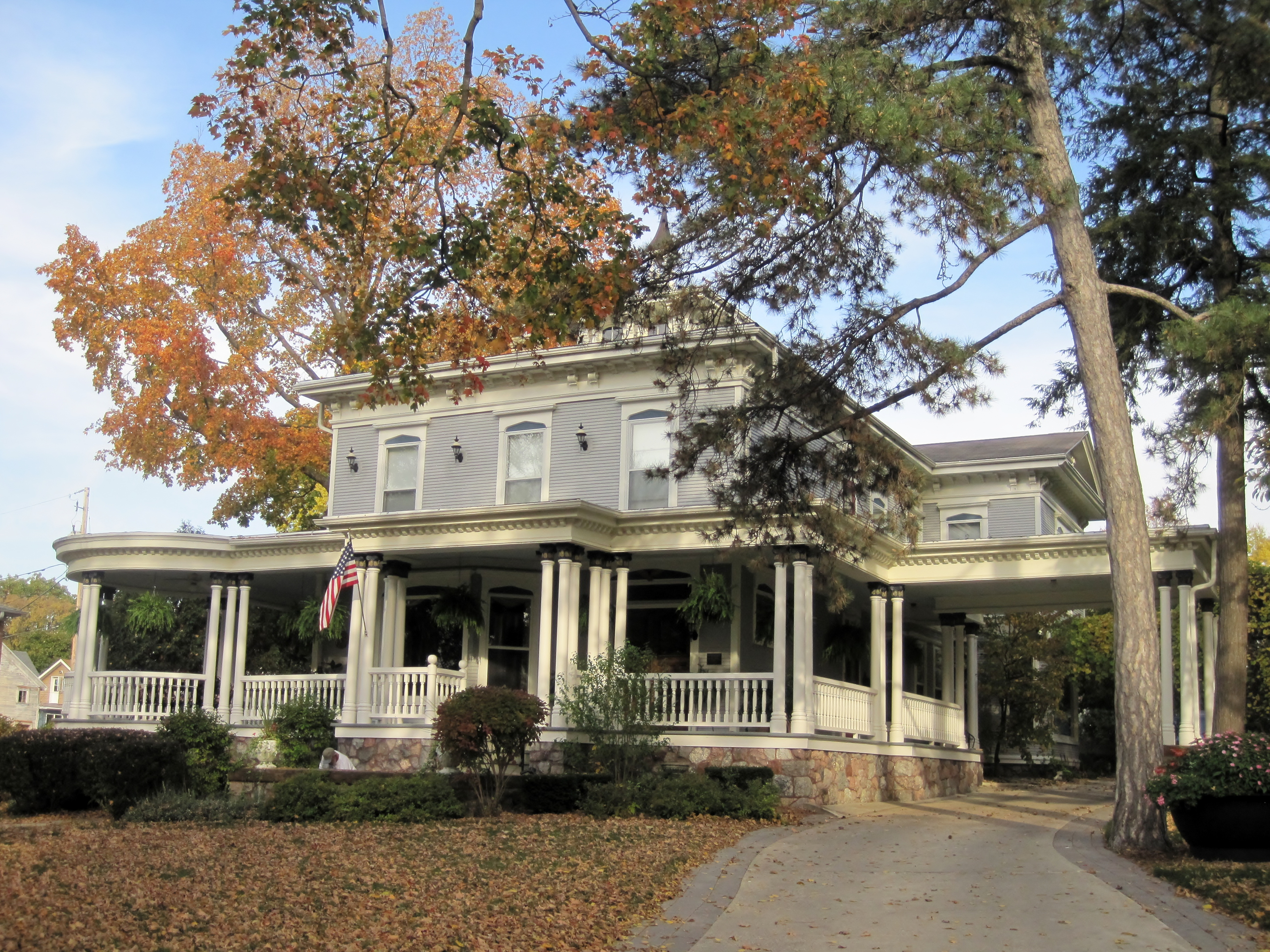
Willard briefly lived in this house in Fort Atkinson.

Present at its original state convention, Willard was an early member of the Republican Party in Wisconsin. He also helped to organize its chapter in Jefferson County. In 1860, Willard was nominated to the Wisconsin State Assembly. There, Willard advocated against sending state delegates to the Peace Conference of 1861. He was re-nominated for the next session, but declined to run. Willard instead took a position on the Jefferson County Board of Supervisors. Later in his life, Willard was known for his independent political stances, supporting Horace Greeley and Samuel J. Tilden for president. He ran for mayor of Fort Atkinson in 1878, but was defeated. He briefly lived in the former George P. Marston House.

Willard married Elizabeth S. Vickery on July 11, 1849. They had one daughter, Julia Adola, who married the son of Congressman Lucien B. Caswell. Willard died in Fort Atkinson, on April 1, 1900, aged 74, and was buried there in Evergreen Cemetery.
