= Hoard's Dairyman Farm =

Coordinates: 42°56′48.8″N 88°50′15.6″W

- U.S. National Register of Historic Places
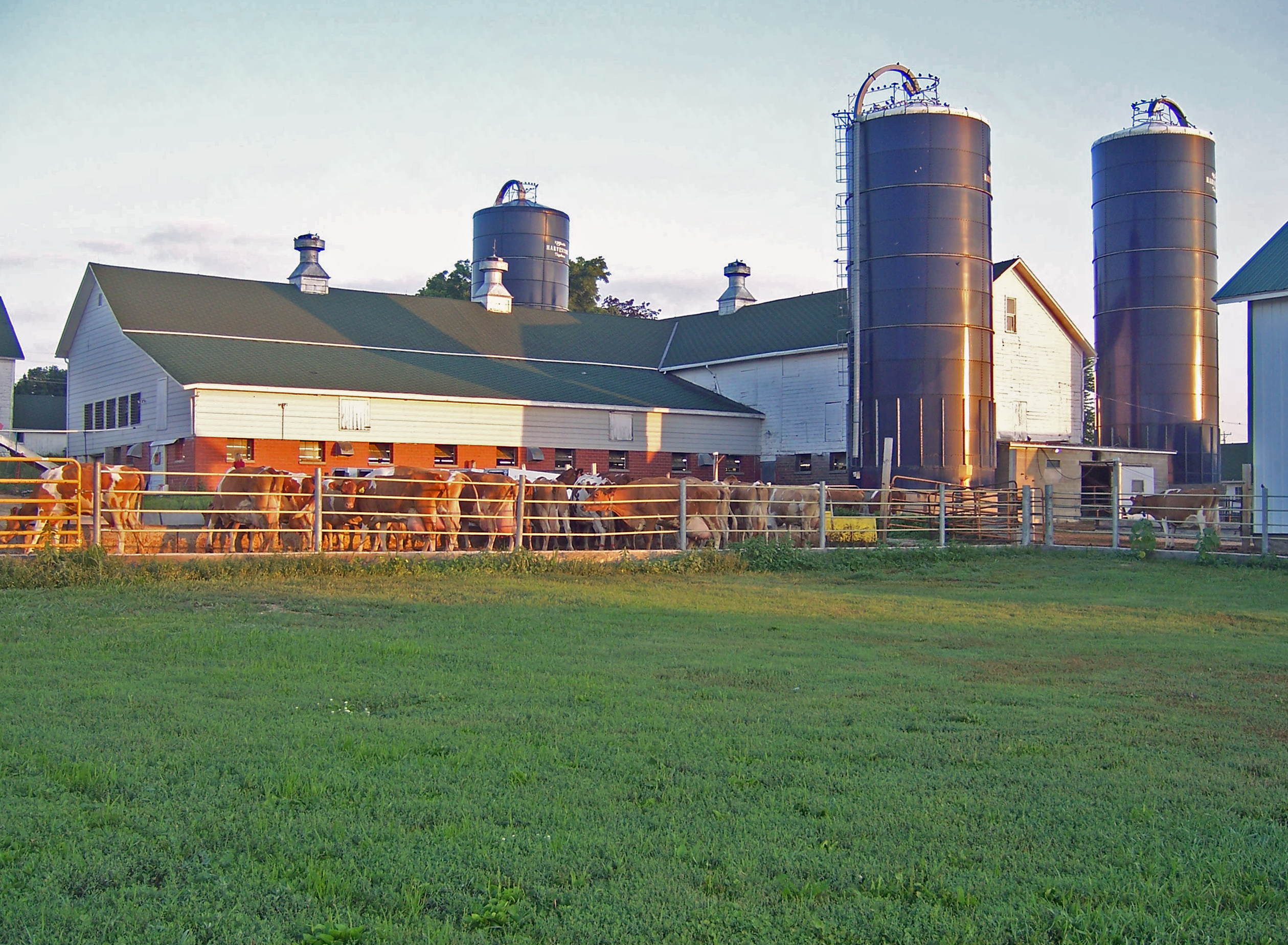
- The old barn and Guernsey cows at the Hoard's Dairyman Farm

- Location within Wisconsin Location within the United States
- Nearest city: Fort Atkinson, Wisconsin
- Area: 173.7 acres (70.3 ha)
- Built: 1899
- Architectural style: Italianate
- NRHP reference No.: 78000105
- Added to NRHP: August 29, 1978

The Hoard's Dairyman Farm, just north of Fort Atkinson, Wisconsin, was purchased in 1899 by W. D. Hoard, a former governor of Wisconsin. Hoard used the farm as a laboratory for testing ideas for his magazine Hoard's Dairyman, like the use of alfalfa for feeding dairy cattle.

This farm was begun in the mid-1800s by Asa Snell. Much has changed since Snell's era, but a few of his buildings survive: the 1845 farmhouse, a machine shed/garage, a horse-barn/heifer shed, and the core of the main dairy barn. Snell's farmhouse is a two-story Italianate-styled building, with walls of brick made nearby at a brickyard owned by Snell himself and Milo Jones. A kitchen wing extends to the east leading to a summer kitchen, and other wings extend to the north and south. The house's roof was originally flat. Hoard replaced the flat roofs with hip roofs soon after he bought the farm.

Hoard bought the farm in 1899. Before then he had served in the Civil War, edited the Jefferson County Union newspaper, started the Wisconsin Dairyman's Association, founded the important agricultural journal Hoard's Dairyman in 1885, and served one term as governor of Wisconsin from 1889 to 1891. Despite his venture into politics, Hoard remained very interested in agriculture and the scientific improvement of dairy practices. He bought the farm to use as a lab for testing the effectiveness and practicality of the ideas that he promoted in his magazine.

These are some of the important innovations tested at the farm:

- Alfalfa: Hoard showed that this perennial legume could be grown in northern climates. He demonstrated practical methods of growing, harvesting, and preserving the crop. He further showed that it could be used as a high-quality feed for dairy cattle. Today, alfalfa is a staple in dairy cattle rations nationwide.
- Record keeping on farms: The Hoard farm started keeping a herd book in 1905 and milk records back to 1920. These records support informed decisions about animals and practices.
- Silos and silage: The farm tried this economical method for fermenting cattle feed, rather than drying it.
- Eradication of bovine tuberculosis: Hoard had begun promoting a campaign against TB in 1895, and continued it at the farm.
- Loose pen housing: In 1912 Hoard began advocating raising cattle in pens rather than individual stalls, aiming to save construction costs and ongoing labor. This is now common practice.

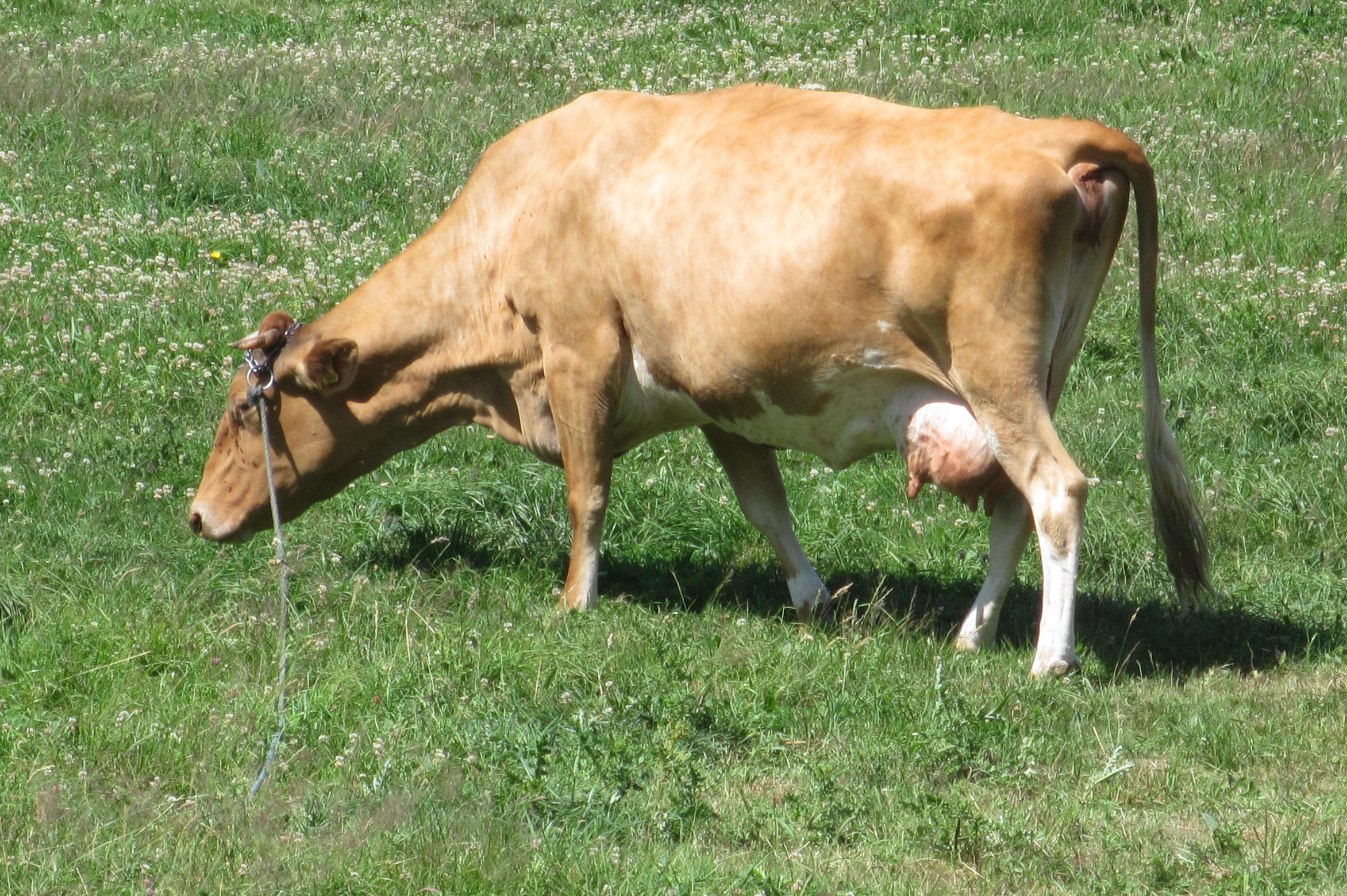

- Herd test: Starting in 1917 Hoard's farm "was the dominating influence in the founding of the herd test, proved sire, brood cow research program conducted by the U.S. Department of Agriculture."
- Single-purpose dairy cow: The farm maintains the oldest continuously registered herd of Guernsey cattle in the country. For over a century, the herd was housed in the same barn that was purchased by Hoard in 1899. It was enlarged several times to a final capacity of eighty cows. In the summer of 2007, the herd was moved to a new, state of the art free-stall facility and expanded to 270 milking cows.
