= 1888 Wisconsin gubernatorial election =

- November 6, 1888
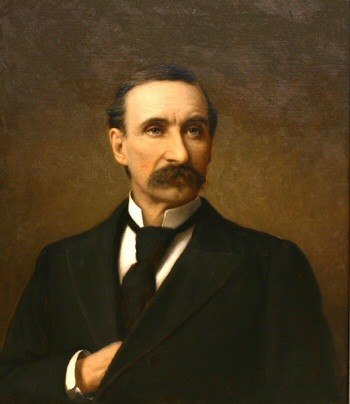

Nominee	William D. Hoard	James Morgan
Party	Republican	Democratic
Popular vote	175,696	155,423
Percentage	49.53%	43.82%
- County results Hoard : 40–50% 50–60% 60–70% 70–80% Morgan : 40–50% 50–60% 60–70% 70–80%
Governor before election
Jeremiah McLain Rusk
Republican
Elected Governor
William D. Hoard
Republican

The 1888 Wisconsin gubernatorial election was held on November 6, 1888.

Republican nominee William D. Hoard defeated Democratic nominee James Morgan and two other candidates with 49.53% of the vote.

== General election ==
=== Candidates ===
Major party candidates

- James Morgan, Democratic, businessman
- William D. Hoard, Republican, dairy farmer and newspaper editor

Other candidates

- E. G. Durant, Prohibition
- David Frank Powell, Union Labor, former mayor of La Crosse

=== Results ===
1888 Wisconsin gubernatorial election
Party	Candidate	Votes	%	±%
Republican	William D. Hoard	175,696	49.53%	+3.00%
Democratic	James Morgan	155,423	43.82%	+3.82%
Prohibition	E. G. Durant	14,373	4.05%	−1.92%
Union Labor	D. Frank Powell	9,196	2.59%	−4.90%
	Scattering	26	0.01%	
Majority		20,273	5.71%	
Total votes		354,714	100.00%	
Republican hold		Swing	-0.82%	

=== Results by county ===
County	William D. Hoard Republican		James Morgan Democratic		E. G. Durant Prohibition		D. Frank Powell Union Labor		Margin		Total votes cast
County	#	%	#	%	#	%	#	%	#	%	Total votes cast
Adams	1,100	70.92%	430	27.72%	15	0.97%	6	0.39%	670	43.20%	1,551
Ashland	2,856	55.87%	2,201	43.06%	53	1.04%	1	0.02%	655	12.81%	5,112 (Note: Includes 1 Scattering vote)
Barron	1,794	60.28%	881	29.60%	295	9.91%	6	0.20%	913	30.68%	2,976
Bayfield	1,204	62.13%	707	36.48%	27	1.39%	0	0.00%	497	25.64%	1,938
Brown	2,663	41.42%	3,540	55.05%	115	1.79%	112	1.74%	-877	-13.64%	6,430
Buffalo	1,767	55.65%	1,316	41.45%	86	2.71%	6	0.19%	451	14.20%	3,175
Burnett	491	62.31%	69	8.76%	228	28.93%	0	0.00%	263 (Note: Hoard's margin over Durant)	33.38%	788
Calumet	954	30.53%	1,982	63.42%	44	1.41%	145	4.64%	-1,028	32.90%	3,125
Chippewa	2,678	49.02%	2,503	45.82%	282	5.16%	0	0.00%	175	3.20%	5,463
Clark	2,263	60.75%	1,286	34.52%	144	3.87%	32	0.86%	977	26.23%	3,725
Columbia	3,506	53.43%	2,652	40.41%	389	5.93%	14	0.21%	854	13.01%	6,562
Crawford	1,806	52.18%	1,562	45.13%	59	1.70%	34	0.98%	244	7.05%	3,461
Dane	6,844	47.73%	6,410	44.70%	1,079	7.52%	7	0.05%	434	3.03%	14,340
Dodge	3,144	33.16%	6,078	64.11%	218	2.30%	39	0.41%	-2,934	-30.95%	9,480
Door	1,688	60.68%	1,039	37.35%	52	1.87%	2	0.07%	649	23.33%	2,782
Douglas	1,181	59.80%	5576	39.29%	15	0.76%	3	0.15%	405	20.51%	1,975
Dunn	2,526	60.06%	1,302	30.96%	285	6.78%	92	2.19%	1,224	29.10%	4,206
Eau Claire	3,215	51.28%	2,396	38.22%	492	7.85%	164	2.62%	819	13.06%	6,269 (Note: Includes 2 Scattering votes)
Florence	313	55.60%	236	41.92%	3	0.53%	11	1.95%	77	13.68%	563
Fond du Lac	4,496	45.77%	4,934	50.23%	297	3.02%	95	0.97%	-438	-4.46%	9,822
Forest	233	50.65%	218	47.39%	9	1.96%	0	0.00%	15	3.26%	460
Grant	4,264	51.99%	3,407	41.54%	434	5.29%	96	1.17%	857	10.45%	8,201
Green	2,625	48.51%	2,122	39.22%	450	8.32%	214	3.95%	503	9.30%	5,411
Green Lake	1,699	52.34%	1,417	43.65%	126	3.88%	4	0.12%	282	8.69%	3,246
Iowa	2,491	47.81%	2,256	43.30%	463	8.89%	0	0.00%	235	4.51%	5,210
Jackson	2,093	62.66%	1,000	29.94%	247	7.40%	0	0.00%	1,093	32.72%	3,340
Jefferson	3,025	40.50%	4,238	56.73%	191	2.56%	15	0.20%	-1,213	-16.24%	7,470
Juneau	2,077	52.88%	1,658	42.21%	181	4.61%	11	0.28%	419	10.67%	3,928
Kenosha	1,691	48.68%	1,674	48.19%	108	3.11%	1	0.03%	17	0.49%	3,474
Kewaunee	878	30.02%	2,046	69.95%	1	0.03%	0	0.00%	-1,168	-39.93%	2,925
La Crosse	3,935	46.03%	3,699	43.27%	398	4.66%	516	6.04%	236	2.76%	8,549
Lafayette	2,563	50.13%	2,284	44.67%	263	5.14%	1	0.02%	279	5.46%	5,113
Langlade	777	37.68%	1,192	57.81%	93	4.51%	0	0.00%	-415	-20.13%	2,062
Lincoln	1,114	46.75%	1,050	44.06%	106	4.45%	113	4.74%	64	2.69%	2,383
Manitowoc	2,681	37.98%	4,237	60.02%	16	0.23%	125	1.77%	-1,556	-22.04%	7,059
Marathon	2,114	36.22%	3,356	57.50%	42	0.72%	317	5.43%	-1,242	-21.28%	5,837 (Note: Includes 8 Scattering votes)
Marinette	1,777	45.67%	1,756	45.13%	224	5.76%	134	3.44%	21	0.54%	3,891
Marquette	1,131	52.31%	999	46.21%	27	1.25%	4	0.19%	132	6.11%	2,162
Milwaukee	20,887	47.94%	17,703	40.63%	333	0.76%	4,647	10.67%	3,184	7.31%	43,570
Monroe	2,710	52.88%	2,135	41.66%	251	4.90%	29	0.57%	575	11.22%	5,125
Oconto	1,313	52.35%	1,154	46.01%	35	1.40%	6	0.24%	159	6.34%	2,508
Oneida	767	46.63%	871	52.95%	6	0.36%	1	0.06%	-104	-6.32%	1,645
Outagamie	2,779	39.32%	4,005	56.66%	185	2.62%	99	1.40%	-1,226	-17.35%	7,068
Ozaukee	755	26.30%	2,025	70.53%	4	0.14%	86	3.00%	-1,270	-44.24%	2,871
Pepin	926	59.28%	461	29.51%	175	11.20%	0	0.00%	465	29.77%	1,562
Pierce	2,483	58.76%	1,158	27.40%	537	12.71%	47	1.11%	1,325	31.35%	4,226
Polk	1,728	64.77%	606	22.71%	334	12.52%	0	0.00%	1,122	42.05%	2,668
Portage	2,575	50.65%	2,322	45.67%	165	3.25%	22	0.43%	253	4.98%	5,084
Price	912	55.81%	620	37.94%	101	6.18%	0	0.00%	292	17.87%	1,634
Racine	3,923	49.09%	3,293	41.20%	462	5.78%	314	3.93%	630	7.88%	7,992
Richland	2,457	54.47%	1,734	38.44%	294	6.52%	25	0.55%	723	16.03%	4,511
Rock	6,193	60.61%	3,509	34.34%	508	4.97%	7	0.07%	2,684	26.27%	10,217
Sauk	3,400	51.31%	2,657	40.10%	535	8.07%	34	0.51%	743	11.21%	6,626
Sawyer	542	51.52%	508	48.29%	1	0.10%	0	0.00%	34	3.23%	1,052
Shawano	1,784	51.46%	1,635	47.16%	25	0.72%	23	0.66%	149	4.30%	3,467
Sheboygan	3,683	42.98%	4,386	51.18%	65	0.76%	436	5.09%	-703	-8.20%	8,570
St. Croix	2,753	50.33%	2,135	39.03%	530	9.69%	52	0.95%	618	11.30%	5,470
Taylor	788	51.60%	723	47.35%	15	0.98%	1	0.07%	65	4.26%	1,527
Trempealeau	2,276	55.88%	1,567	38.47%	229	5.62%	1	0.02%	709	17.41%	4,073
Vernon	3,321	64.20%	1,540	29.77%	263	5.08%	49	0.95%	1,781	34.43%	5,173
Walworth	4,447	62.10%	2,036	28.43%	584	8.16%	94	1.31%	2,411	33.67%	7,161
Washburn	514	52.18%	363	36.85%	107	10.86%	1	0.10%	151	15.33%	985
Washington	1,853	38.96%	2,892	60.81%	11	0.23%	0	0.00%	-1,039	-21.85%	4,756
Waukesha	3,848	50.51%	3,445	45.22%	302	3.96%	24	0.32%	403	5.29%	7,619
Waupaca	3,383	62.92%	1,778	33.07%	163	3.03%	53	0.99%	1,605	29.85%	5,377
Waushara	2,258	72.70%	658	21.18%	157	5.05%	33	1.06%	1,600	51.51%	3,106
Winnebago	4,885	46.05%	4,609	43.45%	401	3.78%	713	6.72%	276	2.60%	10,608
Wood	1,896	47.41%	1,986	49.66%	38	0.95%	79	1.98%	-90	-2.25%	3,999
Total	175,696	49.53%	155,423	43.82%	14,373	4.05%	9,196	2.59%	20,273	5.72%	354,714

==== Counties that flipped from Democratic to Republican ====
- Ashland
- Bayfield
- Chippewa
- Forest
- La Crosse
- Sawyer

==== Counties that flipped from Union Labor to Republican ====
- Milwaukee

== Bibliography ==
- Glashan, Roy R. (1979). American Governors and Gubernatorial Elections, 1775-1978. Meckler Books. ISBN 0-930466-17-9.
- Gubernatorial Elections, 1787-1997. Washington, D.C.: Congressional Quarterly Inc. 1998. ISBN 1-56802-396-0.
- Timme, Ernst G., ed. (1889). The Blue Book of the State of Wisconsin. The Milwaukee Litho. & Engr. Co.
