= Hoard's Dairyman =

Magazine in American Dairy Industry

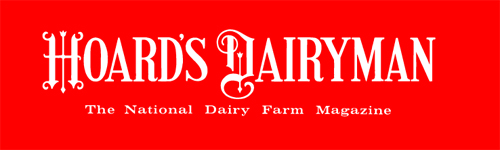
- Managing Editor: Corey A. Geiger
- Associate Editor: Abby J. Bauer
- Associate Editor: Katelyn Allen
- Categories: Agriculture, dairy farming
- Frequency: 15 per year
- Total circulation (2021): 47,650
- Founder: William D. Hoard
- Founded: 1885
- First issue: January 23, 1885; 140 years ago
- Country: United States
- Based in: Fort Atkinson, Wisconsin
- Language: English
- Website: hoards.com
- ISSN: 0018-2885

Hoard's Dairyman is an American agricultural trade publication that focuses on dairy farming. It was founded in 1885 by William D. Hoard as a supplement to the Jefferson County Union and is published in Fort Atkinson, Wisconsin.

== History ==
The Dairyman was founded in 1885 in Fort Atkinson, Wisconsin, by William D. Hoard as an expansion of regular agriculture columns he wrote in the Jefferson County Union. It began as a four-page folio supplement to the Union and became a wholly separate publication in 1889. The publication grew rapidly, rising from 700 subscriptions to the folio in its first year to more than 6,000 subscriptions by 1889.

Hoard used the magazine to advocate for new agricultural techniques, including the use of alfalfa as cattle feed, the use of silos to store silage, and the use of the Babcock test to measure the level of butterfat in milk. Advocacy for the use of silos had particular success; by 1925, one-fourth of all silos in the United States were on the farms of Dairyman subscribers. Hoard also used the magazine to advocate for legislation, such as using the Dairyman to organize a letter writing campaign to increase regulations on the sale of oleomargarine in 1895. Hoard led the publication until his death in 1918, when he was succeeded as managing editor by Arthur J. Glover.

By the mid-1920s, the Dairyman had an international audience, with readers in Japan, Australia, and England. By 1985, circulation had grown to 180,000 in 104 countries. That year, 91% of milk producers in the United States received the Dairyman. As of 2021, circulation of the magazine had declined to 47,650.

== Hoard's Dairyman Farm ==
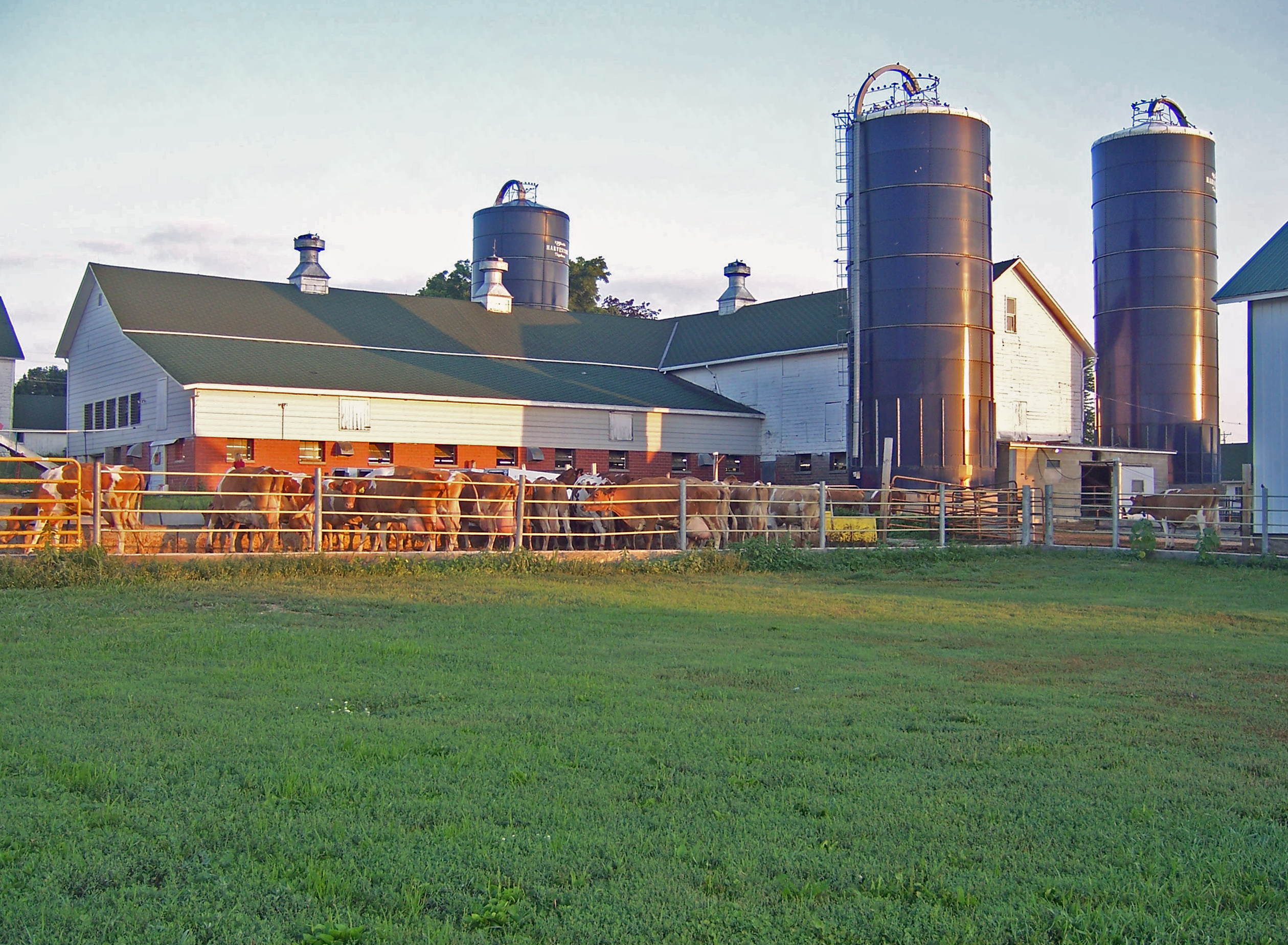
Staff members of Hoard's Dairyman also work at the Hoard's Dairyman Farm.

In 1899, Hoard established Hoard's Dairyman Farm north of Fort Atkinson. Described by the Los Angeles Times as the "best-known dairy farm in the world," the property was used as a means to increase the credibility of the Dairyman and as a place to conduct agricultural experiments. It was where Hoard proved the efficacy of alfalfa as cattle feed.

The farm maintains the oldest continuously registered herd of Guernsey cattle in the United States. Editorial staff of the Dairyman manage the operations of the farm.

== See also ==
- Hoard Historical Museum
