= William D. Hoard =

American politician, publisher, and advocate (1836–1918)

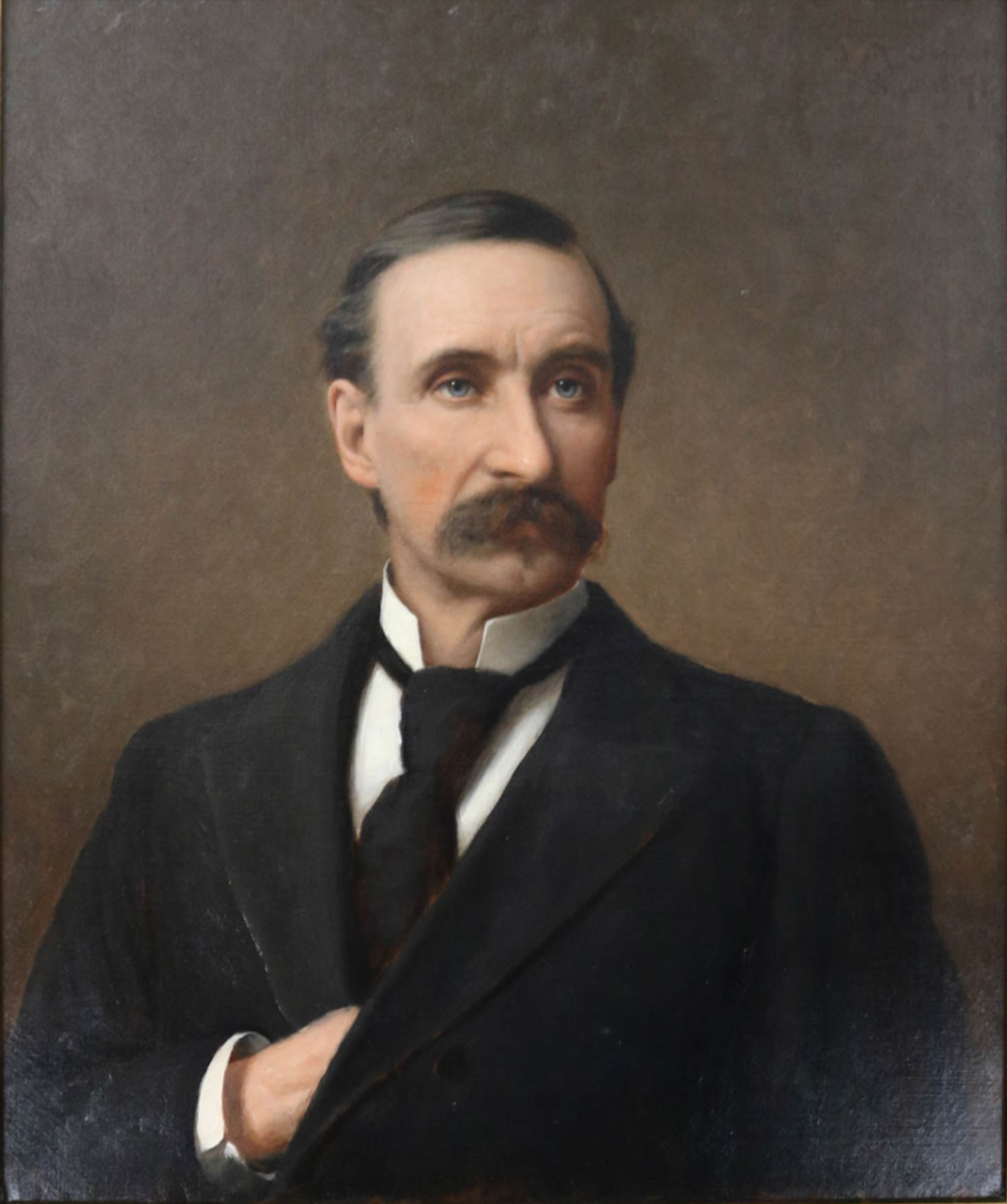
- Portrait c. 1891

16th Governor of Wisconsin
- In office January 7, 1889 – January 5, 1891
- Preceded by: Jeremiah M. Rusk
- Succeeded by: George Wilbur Peck

Personal details
- Born: William Dempster Hoard; October 10, 1836 Munnsville, New York, U.S.
- Died: November 22, 1918 (aged 82) Fort Atkinson, Wisconsin, U.S.
- Resting place: Fort Atkinson, Wisconsin
- Monuments: William D. Hoard Monument at University of Wisconsin–Madison
- Board member of: University of Wisconsin Board of Regents; Wisconsin Dairymen's Association; National Dairy Union
- Party: Republican
- Spouse: Agnes Elizabeth Bragg (m. 1860)
- Children: 3
- Parents: William Bradford Hoard (father); Sarah Katherine White Hoard (mother)
- Occupation: Publisher, politician
- Known for: Agriculture advocacy, Hoard's Dairyman

William Dempster Hoard (October 10, 1836 – November 22, 1918) was an American politician, newspaper publisher, and agriculture advocate who was the 16th governor of Wisconsin from 1889 to 1891. Called the "father of modern dairying", Hoard's advocacy for scientific agriculture and the expansion of dairy farming has been credited with changing Wisconsin's agricultural economy. He promoted the use of silos and alfalfa for cattle feed, testing for bovine tuberculosis, and raising particular breeds of cattle for milk or meat in his magazine Hoard's Dairyman. His work with the Wisconsin Dairymen's Association led to the export of Wisconsin dairy products to the East Coast, and they earned national renown.

As editor of his newspaper, the Jefferson County Union, Hoard defied trends of the time for small newspapers by expanding the coverage area of the paper and including a strongly voiced editorial page, which he used to advocate for improved farming practices and dairy farming. As governor of Wisconsin, Hoard established the Dairy and Food Commission—one of the first food inspection agencies in the United States—and signed a controversial, short-lived compulsory education law that required all students in the state to be taught in English as part of the Americanization process for immigrants.

== Early life and education ==
William D. Hoard was born on October 10, 1836, in Munnsville, New York, to William Bradford Hoard and Sarah Katherine White Hoard. He was the eldest of four children. His father was a blacksmith and itinerant Methodist minister who preached to the Oneida people. Hoard was educated in a one-room log schoolhouse built by his grandfather, Enos, who also maintained a library. The library and encouragement from Hoard's mother led to a passion for reading. Enos brought Hoard while purchasing dairy cattle and educated him on dairy farming as a child. When he was 16, Hoard left school to work as a farmhand for Waterman Simons, a neighboring dairy farmer from whom Hoard learned how to make cheese and butter. While working as a farmhand, Hoard witnessed the depletion of New York soil by the growing of wheat and other crops, which led to the adoption of dairy farming in the state. During this time, he managed a 50-cow herd and read technical journals on farming.

In 1857, Hoard moved to Oak Grove, Wisconsin, and studied to become a Methodist minister. Ideological conflict with church leadership led him to cease his studies. For the next three years, Hoard found employment chopping wood and giving singing lessons. In 1860, he married Agnes Elizabeth Bragg and moved in with her parents in Lake Mills, Wisconsin. The couple had three children: Halbert Louis, Arthur Ralph, and Frank Ward.

After the outbreak of the American Civil War, Hoard—an admirer of Abraham Lincoln—enlisted in the Union Army. He was assigned to the 4th Wisconsin Infantry Regiment as a fife player and participated in the capture of New Orleans. Hoard became ill while pursuing Confederate soldiers and was discharged. He returned to his parents' farm in New York; after fully recovering, he re-enlisted in the Union Army and was assigned to Battery A of the 1st New York Light Artillery Battalion, serving until the end of the war in 1865. After the war, Hoard moved to Columbus, Wisconsin, and attempted to grow hops. The price of the crop collapsed, and Hoard gave up hop farming.

== Career ==
=== Publishing and advocacy ===
==== Jefferson County Union and Hoard's Dairyman ====
Hoard founded a weekly newspaper, the Jefferson County Union, in Lake Mills in 1870. Against the trends of the time, Hoard expanded his paper's coverage to include surrounding areas. Early editions of the Union were printed under contract with the Watertown Republican, for which Hoard had written before founding his own newspaper. Hoard moved the Union to Fort Atkinson, Wisconsin, in 1873 and by 1883 he had constructed a new building that included a printing press.

Hoard included an editorial page in the Union, a rarity for small newspapers of the time. He used these columns to write about a variety of topics, most prominently the promotion of scientific agricultural practices, and started a dairy farming-specific column in 1872. Readers received these editorials with skepticism due to Hoard's lack of experience in Wisconsin agriculture, and referred to him as a theorist and a "book farmer". Hoard continued to write agriculture columns and, after encouragement from his son Arthur and Whitewater Register publisher Ed E. Coe, founded Hoard's Dairyman in 1885 as a folio supplement to the Union.

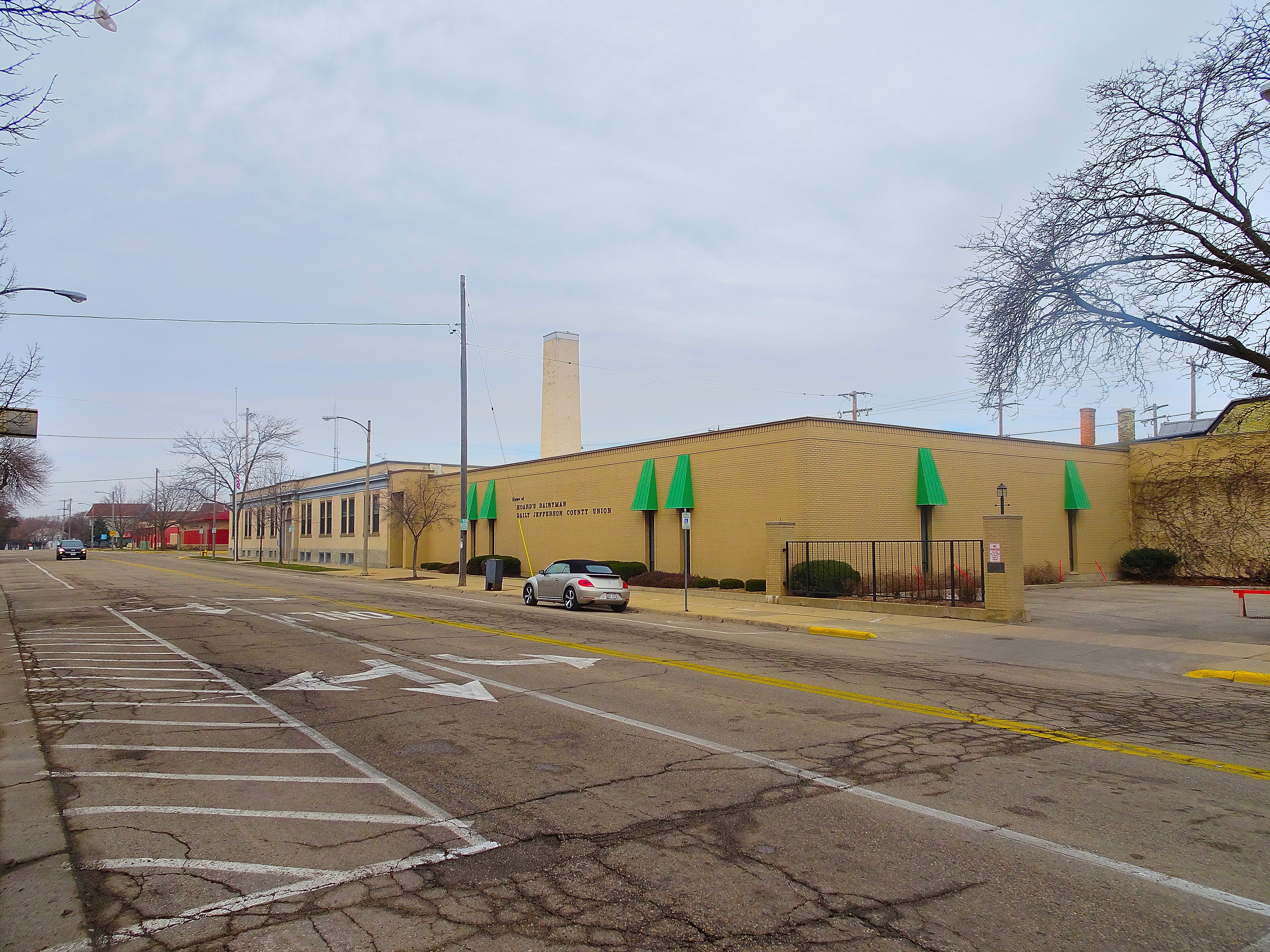
Offices of the Jefferson County Union and Hoard's Dairyman in 2016

The Dairyman was initially financially supported by its parent newspaper. By 1889, it had become a separate magazine that focused primarily on dairy farming. As was commonplace with dairy trade publications at the time, Hoard mixed reporting and advertising in the Dairyman, juxtaposing advertisements with articles promoting the advertised technique or technology. Hoard used the publication to advocate for agricultural and dairy manufacturing practices. These included the testing of herds for bovine tuberculosis, slaughtering infected animals, and providing recompense for farmers who culled their herds; the growth and use of alfalfa as cattle feed, the use of particular breeds of cattle for milking or meat, the use of the Babcock test to analyze the butterfat content of milk, sanitization of milk bottles used in city delivery, the humane treatment of cattle, the formation of agricultural cooperatives to compete with corporations, and the adoption of silos to store cattle feed. Hoard purchased Hoard's Dairyman Farm in 1899, using it to test agricultural theories. By 1924, Hoard's Dairyman had a print circulation of 75,000 and readers in Japan, Australia, and England. It is considered the first agriculture publication to have a nationwide readership in the United States.

==== Trade associations and lobbying ====
Hoard founded the Jefferson County Dairymen's Association in 1871 and cofounded the Wisconsin Dairymen's Association (WDA) with Chester Hazen, Stephen Favill, Walter S. Greene, H.C. Drake, J.G. Hull, M.S. Barrett, D.E. Smith, and H.F. Dousman in 1872. At its founding, Hazen declared the WDA had three goals: to openly discuss dairy problems, eliminate a surplus of cheese and reduce freight rates for rail transport of dairy products, and market to dealers from the East Coast. The WDA sent Hoard to Chicago in 1874 to barter with railroads to secure better prices and refrigerated railcars for the transport of cheese from Wisconsin to the East Coast. His efforts were successful; rates were reduced to one cent per pound. Cheese production in Wisconsin increased rapidly following the rate reduction. In 1876, the American Dairymen's Association invited the WDA to show its products at the Centennial Exhibition. Hoard felt slighted by the group that had ignored him for three years and advocated against going under the auspices of the national association; the other members agreed, rejecting the proposal and ultimately setting up exhibits themselves. Wisconsin dairy products won 20 awards and earned national renown.

Through the Wisconsin Dairymen's Association, Hoard and other founders successfully lobbied for the creation of agriculture-related regulations and educational institutions, including legislation to ban skim and filled cheese, (Note: Skim cheese is cheese made from milk which has had most of its butterfat removed. Filled cheese is made with milk that has its fat content replaced with margarine or lard. These cheeses were difficult to tell apart from cheese made with whole milk when fresh, but spoiled comparatively quickly after production. Prolific production of skim and filled cheese had significantly damaged the reputation of Wisconsin cheese by 1889.) the establishment of farmers' institutes (Note: Farmers' institutes were traveling lecture series put on by the University of Wisconsin to communicate the latest developments in agriculture science to farmers. Hiram Smith installed fellow WDA member William H. Morrison as superintendent of the institutes, which gave the dairy industry an increased presence in the curriculum. Hoard was a popular presenter at these institutes.) and the College of Agriculture at the University of Wisconsin. (Note: Lampard wrote that the first dean of the College of Agriculture William A. Henry "personally owed so much to the support of Hoard and Hiram Smith" and later said, "'The Wisconsin Dairymen's Association is the true parent of the Wisconsin College of Agriculture today.'") In 1890, the group successfully campaigned for the establishment of the first dairy school in the U.S., which taught students to make butter and cheese.

Hoard opposed the sale of adulterated dairy products and oleomargarine, which became popular in the late 1800s. Oleomargarine, made by emulsifying lard with milk and water, was often dyed yellow to give it the appearance of butter and was sold as such. (Note: The problem of fraudulent butter had reached the White House by 1886, with president Grover Cleveland remarking at the passage of the Oleomargarine Act of 1886, "I venture to say that hardly a pound (of oleomargarine) ever entered a poor man's house under its real name and in its true character.") The cost of producing oleomargarine was much lower than that of butter and dairy farmers viewed it as a threat to their livelihoods. In 1894, Hoard founded the National Dairy Union and campaigned for an additional tax to be placed on the sale of dyed oleomargarine, which he viewed as a fraudulent product. (Note: When questioned by Congress about why butter should be allowed to be dyed yellow during certain seasons while oleomargarine should not be allowed to be dyed at all, Hoard compared it to dying fabrics to suit taste, rather than disguising their true nature, saying, "Butter is colored yellow to suit the taste of the consumer and for no other reason, and the product oleomargarine has no more right to this color than the gray goose has to the brilliant plumage of the peacock.") Hoard often testified before Congress about the fraudulent nature of oleomargarine between 1898 and 1902, and helped secure the passage of the Oleomargarine Act of 1902, which added an additional 10-cent tax on the sale of colored oleomargarine and briefly caused a decline in its production.

=== Political career ===
==== Early career ====
In 1870, Hoard was appointed a deputy U.S. Marshal and assigned to be a census taker in Lake Mills and the surrounding area. While taking the census, Hoard met a family of German immigrants who could not speak English and had been tricked out of a large sum of money by English-speaking confidence tricksters. The experience influenced Hoard's opinions on education when he became governor. In 1872, Hoard was named the sergeant-at-arms for the Wisconsin Senate.

==== Governor of Wisconsin ====
By 1888, Hoard had become a popular speaker, lecturing on agricultural topics throughout Wisconsin. The Republican gubernatorial candidate had not yet been decided. Horace Rublee put Hoard's name forth as a candidate in an anonymous Milwaukee Sentinel article in March 1888. He received strong support from farmers throughout the state and was the party's unanimous nominee for governor at the state Republican convention in September 1888. Robert M. La Follette lent Hoard his poll lists and advisers for his gubernatorial campaign. Hoard was elected as the 16th governor of Wisconsin in the election of 1888, defeating Democratic candidate James Morgan. He was inaugurated in 1889 and served a single two-year term. His administration passed a controversial compulsory education law that mandated schools educate their pupils in English. It also created the Dairy and Food Commission to oversee dairy production in the state and enforce bans on skim and filled cheese as well as other adulterated dairy products. It was one of the first food inspection agencies in the United States.

===== Bennett Law =====
The first legislation Hoard signed was the Bennett Law. It passed in April 1889 and mandated children in the state aged 7–14 attend school in their district of residence for at least 12 weeks per year and receive instruction in English. The latter provision was added by Hoard, who advocated for the Americanization of immigrants in the state and viewed the English-only movement as an important step in the process.

By 1890, approximately 70 percent of the Wisconsin population were immigrants or had at least one immigrant parent; many of that group had German ancestry. (Note: Wisconsin's population in 1890 was approximately 1.68 million people; of those, about 620,000 were born in Germany or had at least one parent born in Germany.) German Lutherans and German Catholics in Wisconsin, who combined American patriotism with a strong ethnic pride and affection for speaking the German language, felt the law attacked the independence of their church communities and parochial schools, many of which primarily taught their courses in German. (Note: German Lutherans in Wisconsin at this time had broken away from a caste-like system and relied on church leadership for guidance. This led to the creation of insular communities that heavily emphasized German tradition, called "Germandom" by Louise Phelps Kellogg. German Catholic communities were not as insular, which Kellogg attributed to a higher volume of non-German elements in Catholicism.) Hoard, on the other hand, felt church communities focused more on growing their congregations through these schools than on fostering American citizenship. (Note: In a letter dated December 23, 1915, to Rasmus B. Anderson, Hoard wrote, "I note that the Milwaukee Sentinel states that there are 136,000 young persons in Wisconsin between the ages of 7 and 20 who cannot speak, write, or read English. This is due very largely to church influence which, as you know, has but little purpose in education beyond the perpetuation of ecclesiastical control over the minds of the young. It is the church and its growth first and always with but little care for intelligent American citizenship afterward.") He came to see the law as a matter of the separation of church and state and necessary to protect public schools. Opponents of the law characterized it as paternalistic and Hoard as prejudiced against German-Americans.

In March 1890, the three Catholic bishops of Wisconsin published a manifesto opposing the law and three months later, the Wisconsin, Missouri, and Evangelical synods similarly denounced it. German-language publications throughout the state advocated for the law's repeal and called for Catholics and Lutherans to do the same. Scandinavian immigrants in the state supported the repeal of the law based on its clause requiring students be taught in their district of residence; Scandinavian communities had fewer parochial schools than their German counterparts and were convinced by opponents of the law that it would prevent their children attending them. The Bennett Law became the primary issue of the election of 1890, though economic pressures attributed to the McKinley Tariff also played a significant role. Hoard, a political novice, refused to compromise on the law, leading previously Republican-supporting German voters to turn against the party. Democrats won a supermajority in the Wisconsin Legislature and eight of nine available seats in the U.S. House of Representatives. Hoard was defeated by George Wilbur Peck for the governorship. The Bennett Law was repealed in February 1891, the first act of the new legislature. Historian Louise Phelps Kellogg noted the law's purpose of increasing English literacy in immigrant communities was still achieved; parochial schools sought to prove the legislation was not needed by introducing more English-language instruction in their classrooms.

==== Post-governorship ====
Following his defeat in the election of 1890, Hoard returned to his work with the Union and Dairyman, using his publications to support Robert M. La Follette. Hoard was uneasy about La Follette's more radical positions and began to distance himself from the progressive wing of the party, completely disassociating by the end of the 1905 special session of the Wisconsin Legislature, citing La Follette's dictatorial behavior and Hoard's inability to reconcile elements of the platform that provided more social services with his own ideals. In 1907, Hoard was named to the University of Wisconsin's Board of Regents, where he helped transport a dairy herd to the campus in Madison and arrange the construction of the Livestock Pavilion. He resigned from the Board in 1911, citing efforts by Governor Francis E. McGovern to fill it with La Follette loyalists.

== Legacy ==
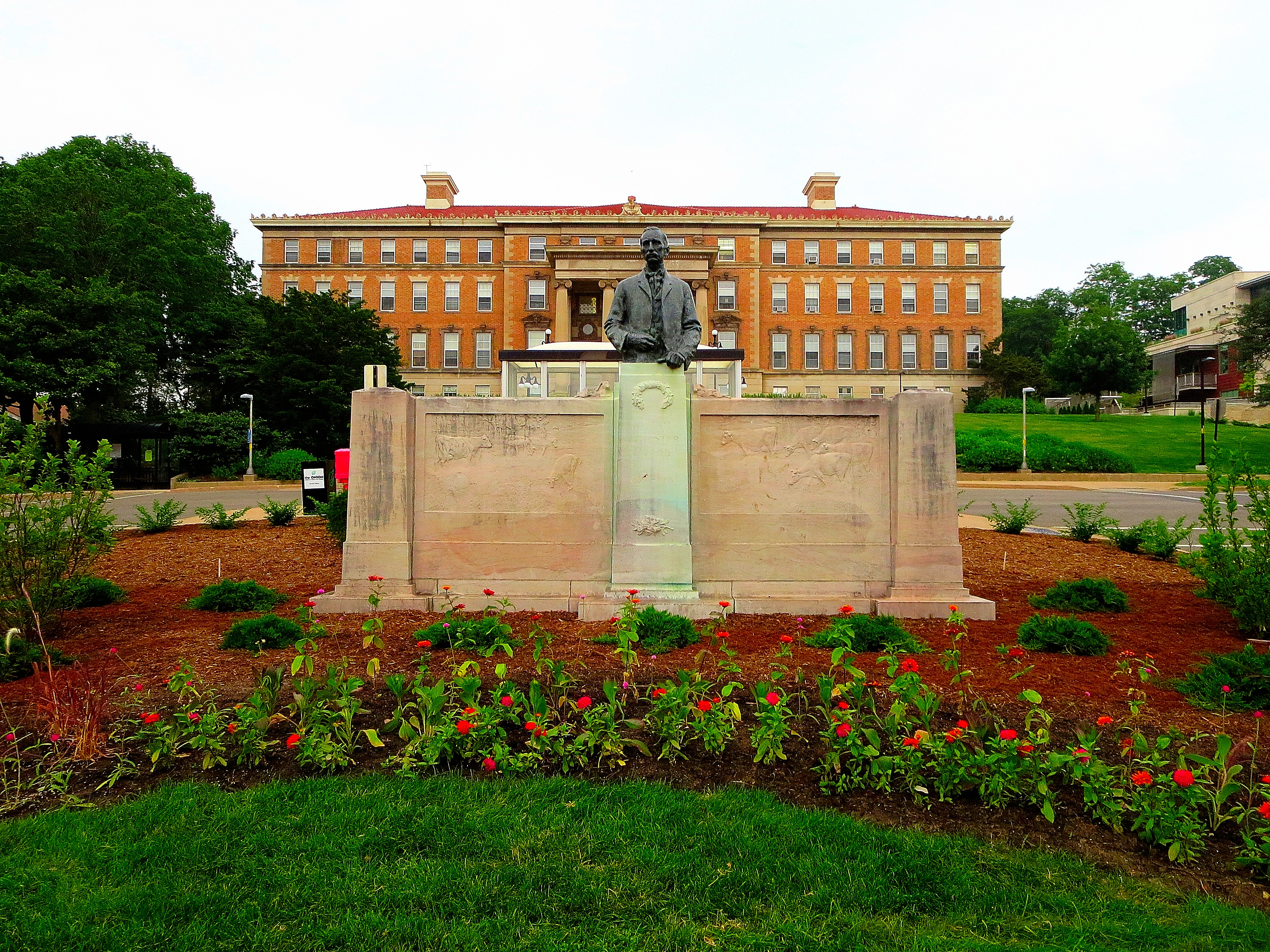
William Dempster Hoard Sculpture by Gutzon Borglum

Hoard died on November 22, 1918, and was buried in Fort Atkinson. He has been credited with changing the agricultural economy of Wisconsin from the growth of wheat to the raising of dairy cattle and production of dairy products, and the Los Angeles Times called him "the father of modern dairying". Wisconsin governor Emanuel L. Philipp assembled a committee that named Hoard the state's "Most Distinguished Citizen" in 1915. Gutzon Borglum made a statue of Hoard, which was placed on Henry Mall in front of the College of Agriculture on the University of Wisconsin campus in 1922. In 2010, the Wisconsin Legislature made his birthday, October 10, a state holiday. Hoard's Dairyman Farm is listed on the National Register of Historic Places and is considered the most famous dairy farm in the world.

== See also ==
- History of cheesemaking in Wisconsin
- Hoard Historical Museum – American dairy industry history organization

== Notes ==
Party political offices
Preceded by Jeremiah McLain Rusk	Republican nominee for Governor of Wisconsin; 1888, 1890	Succeeded by John Coit Spooner
Political offices
Preceded by Jeremiah McLain Rusk	Governor of Wisconsin; 1889–1891	Succeeded by George Peck
