= Babcock bottle =

Device for measuring fat content in liquids

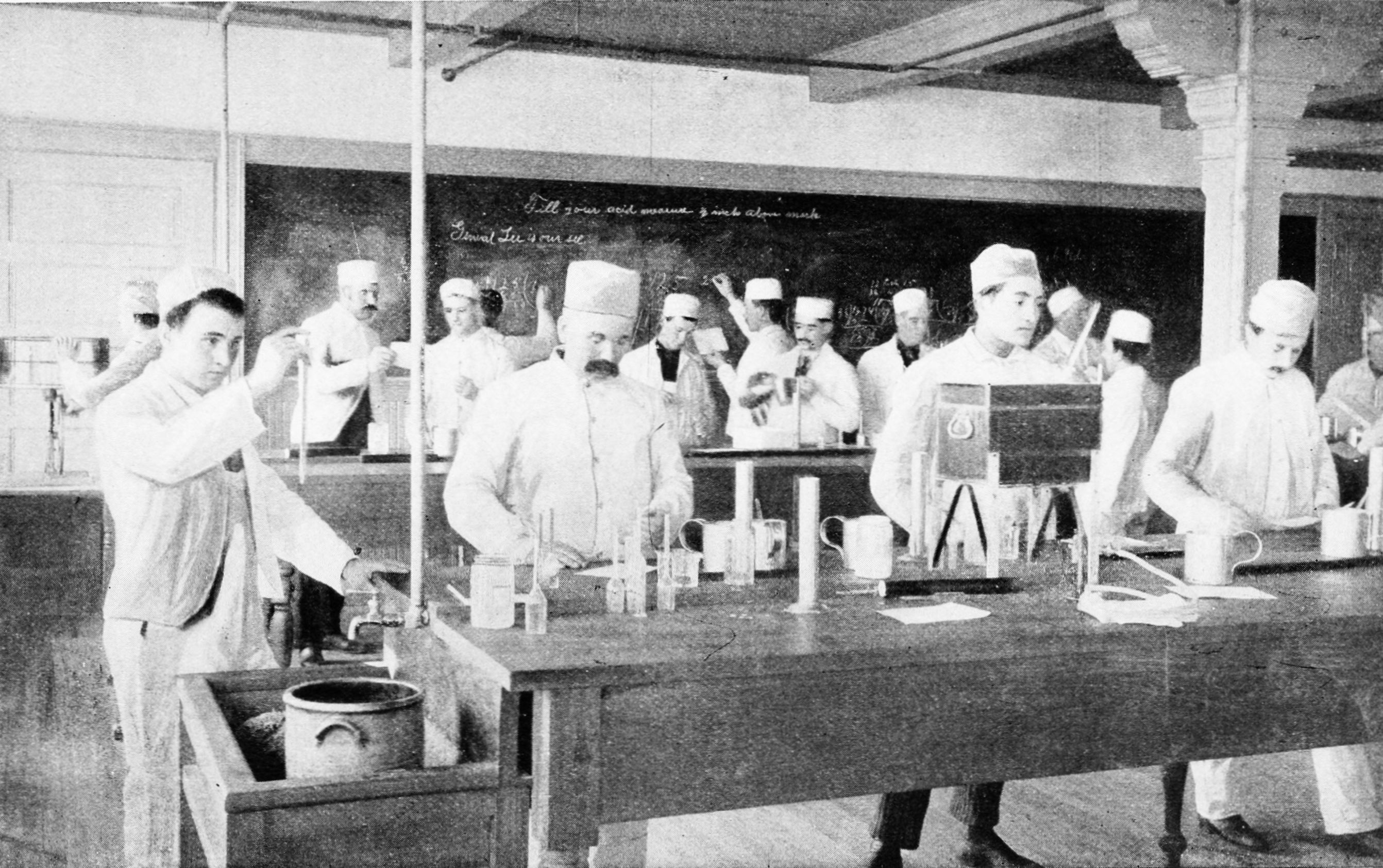
Milk testing laboratory, Wisconsin dairy school (1894). A few Babcock bottles are on the counter, just below center.

A Babcock bottle is a clear glass flask with a long graduated neck, used in the Babcock test to evaluate the cream contents of milk. It is also called a Babcock milk test bottle, milk test bottle, cream test bottle, and other similar names.

This bottle (or variations thereof) may also be used to estimate the amount of a lighter phase in other two-phase mixtures, such as are obtained in standard tests for gasoline and other petroleum products.

== Description ==
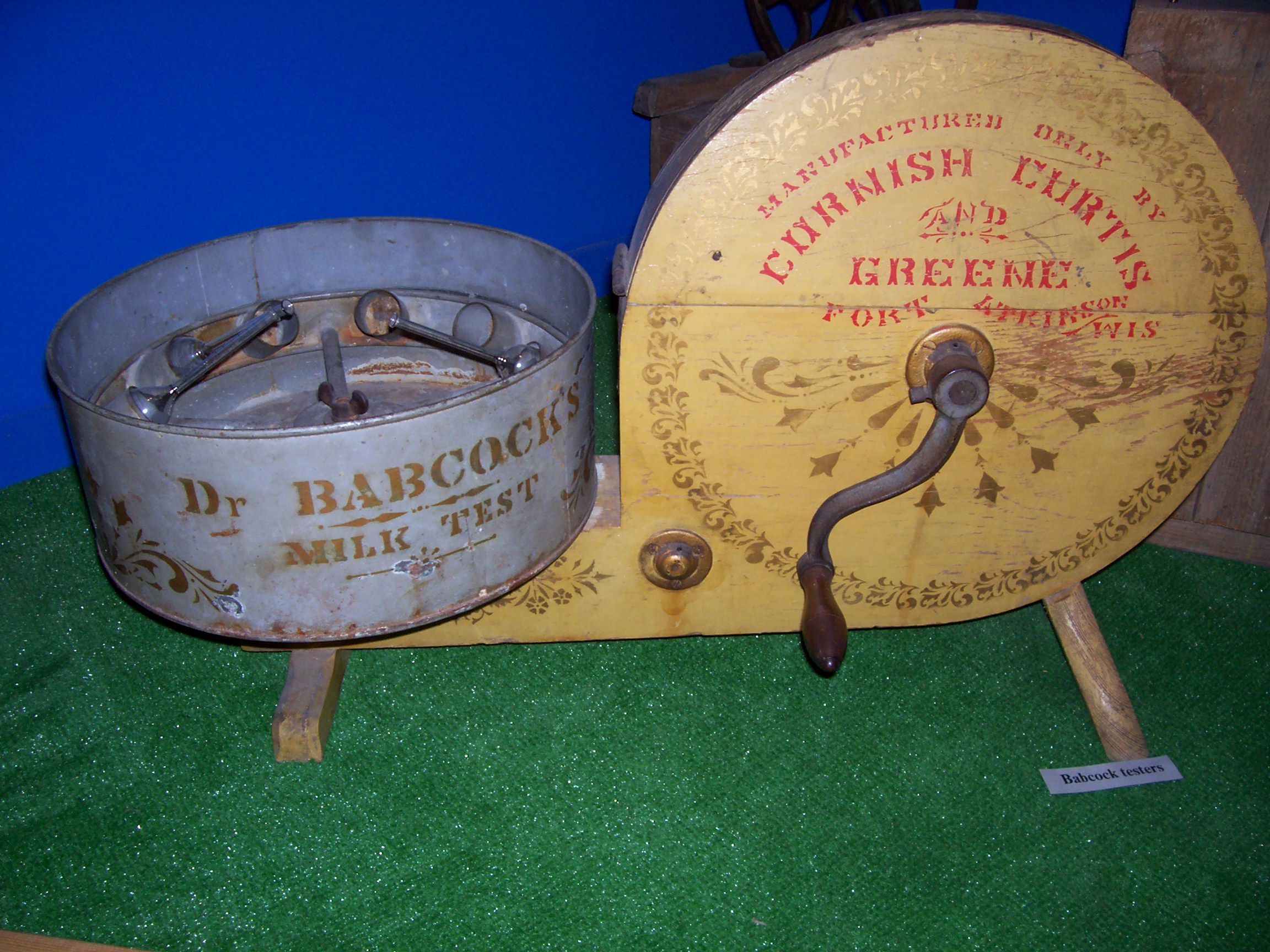
Hand centrifuge for the Babcock test, with three Babcock bottles inserted in their holders.

The Babcock test consists in adding to a standard sample of the milk certain chemicals that cause the fat to separate into a liquid layer, floating at the top of a water-based layer. More water is then added to the mixture, until the fat layer is completely inside the neck, where its volume can be read out from the scale.

The Babcock bottle for milk testing was standardized with great detail in 1917 by the American Dairy Science Association (ADSA). The total height should be 150-165 mm, and the neck should be at least 63.5 mm long. The body should have a capacity of at least 45 mL. The graduated scale on the neck should have marks at every 0.02 mL of internal volume, corresponding to 0.1 percent fat in a standard sample of 17.6 mL (18 grams) of milk, from 0 to 8 percent. The top must be flared to at least 10 mm diameter.

The bottle usually has a bullet-shaped body for easy cleaning. Its width and shape were chosen to match the manual centrifuges originally used in the Babcock test. The body was 37 mm wide just below the rounded top, and might be cylindrical or slightly tapered inwards going down. The minimum capacity of 45 mL is intended to contain the standard sample of milk, and at least an equal amount of other reagents. Some bottles had a ground glass stopper.

=== Variations ===
Babcock bottles for measuring the fat contents in cream have wider necks to allow for readings of 50% or more (rather than up to 8%).

Louis Nafis patented in 1921 a modified Babcock bottle, claimed to be less susceptible to accidental breakage. Instead of the integral long graduated neck, it had a short neck to which a rubber ring was fitted. After processing and centrifuging the milk in the bottom part, two other glass parts would be added. A wider glass tube would be hermetically fitted on the outer edge of that ring, and inside it would be placed a narrow graduated tube, with a flared opening at bottom, resting on the rubber ring without a seal. Warm water would be poured down between the two tubes, seep under the inner tube, and lift the fat into the latter. However, there seems to be no evidence that this invention has ever been marketed or used.

A variant of the Babcock bottle has a glass tube parallel to the neck, that crosses the wall of the body and ends just above its bottom. It allows the addition of water without disturbing the layer of fat as it rises into the graduated neck. In this variant, the flaring is on the auxiliary tube instead of on the neck.

Another variant of this flask is the Paley-Babcock or Paley bottle, which is intended for viscous liquids or solids (like cheese or meat) that would be difficult to introduce through the narrow neck. It has an opening on the body, just below the neck, that can be closed with a stopper.

A Babcock bottle with different dimensions (165 mm high, 10 mL capacity) is used to determine the amount of unsaturated hydrocarbons in gasoline.

== Uses ==
The Babcock bottle was originally developed to determine the fat content of milk. Other uses of the container and its variations include measuring the contents of:

- Fat in cream and ice cream.
- Fat and free fatty acids in cheese.
- Fat in meat.
- Non-sulfonatable components in petroleum products.
- Unsaturated hydrocarbons in gasoline.
- Mineral oil adulteration in turpentine.
- Mercaptans in naphtha.
- Ortho-xylene in recycled styrene.
- Aromatics in hydrocarbons.
- Essential oil in alcohol-based essences.

== History ==
The bottle and the test were developed in 1890 by Stephen M. Babcock (1843–1931), professor at the University of Wisconsin,

In 1911, ADSA's Committee on Official Methods of Testing Milk and Cream for Butterfat, chaired by O. F. Hunziker, met in Washington DC with the Dairy Division of the USDA, the U.S. Bureau of Standards and manufacturers of glassware. As a result of those talks, the procedure and glassware were standardized by the US Government in 1917. Additional specifications were published by the Association of Official Agricultural Chemists (now AOAC International) in 1927.

An earlier manufacturer of Babcock bottles was Louis F. Nafis (1874–1955), whose eponymic Chicago-based company was sold to the Kimble Glass Company (now part of DWK Life Sciences) in 1932.

== See also ==
- Hydrometer, used to measure the density of milk and other liquids.
- Graduated cylinder
- Volumetric flask
- Test tube brush, section "Babcock test bottle brush"
