= Babcock test =

Procedure to determine fat content of milk

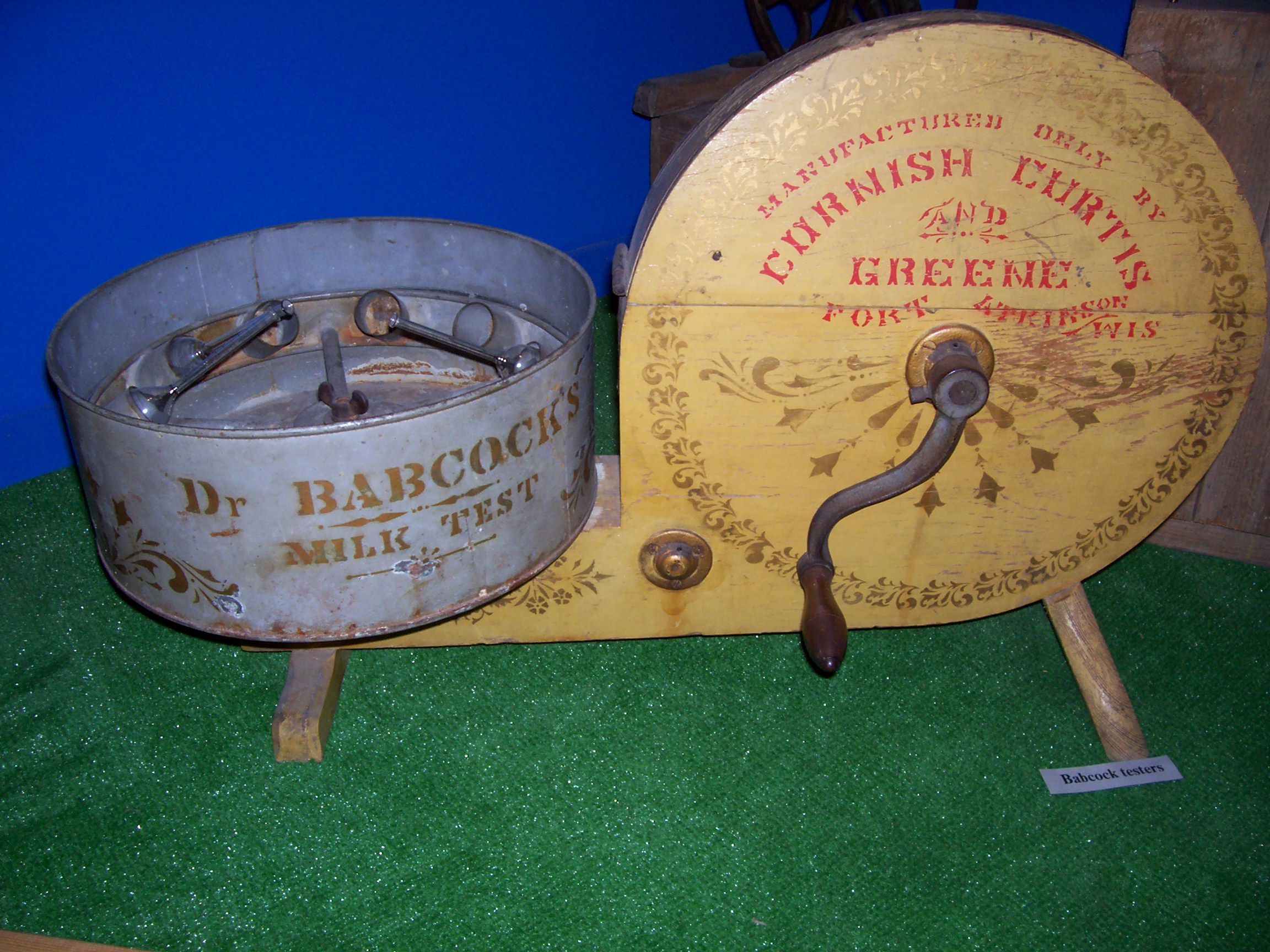
Hand centrifuge for the Babcock test

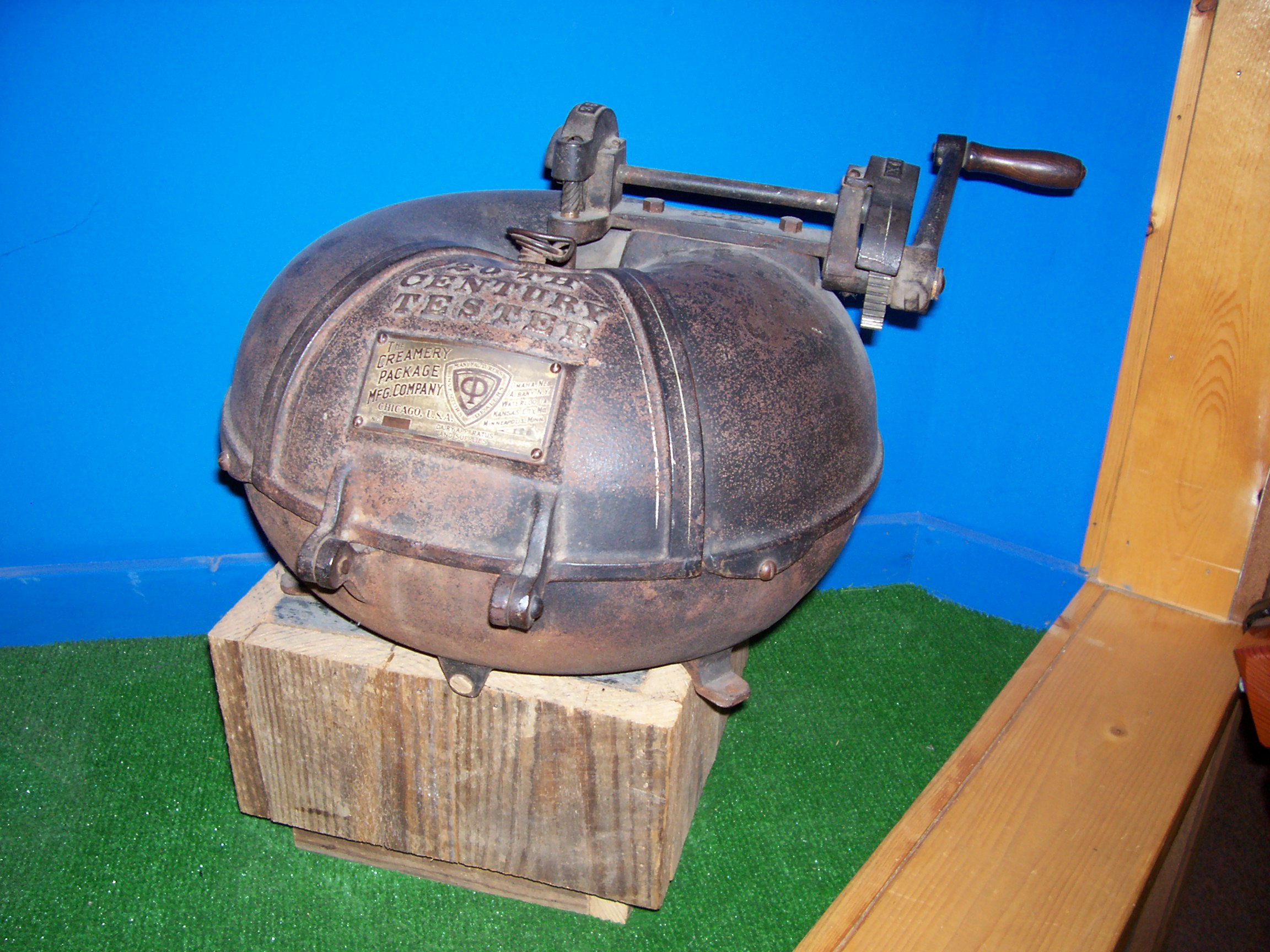
Hand centrifuge for the Babcock test

The Babcock test is an inexpensive and practical procedure to determine the fat content of milk. It is named after its developer, Stephen M. Babcock (1843–1931), professor at the University of Wisconsin.

== History ==
The bottle and the test were developed by Stephen Babcock in 1890 as a simple but accurate way to detect adulterations practiced by some dairy farmers, including diluting the milk with water or skimming some cream.

The test was quickly adopted by dairymen, and also by farmers to help the breeding of milk cows. The tests were usually done monthly by an employee of the local Dairy Herd Improvement Association. Babcock's refusal to patent his process or the device greatly helped its widespread diffusion.

In 1911, the American Dairy Science Association's Committee on Official Methods of Testing Milk and Cream for Butterfat, chaired by O. F. Hunziker, met in Washington DC with the Dairy Division of the USDA, the U.S. Bureau of Standards and manufacturers of glassware. As a result of those talks, the procedure and the special glassware were standardized by the US government in 1917. Additional specifications were published by the Association of Official Agricultural Chemists (now AOAC International) in 1927.

== Process ==
The test is based on the observation that a suitable amount of sulfuric acid added to the milk will dissolve proteins and other components, except the fat. Heating and centrifuging cause the fat to separate and float to the top, in a layer free of bubbles. The amount of fat in the milk can then be estimated from the volume of that layer. The procedure was commonly carried out in a special flask with a long neck, called a Babcock bottle.

Specifically, the test consisted of the following steps:

1. Place 17.6 mL (18 grams) of milk into a Babcock bottle.
2. Add 17.6 mL of 90-92% sulfuric acid at 15-20°C.
3. Spin the flask in a hand-cranked centrifuge for 5 minutes.
4. Add water at 60°C until the fat layer is all in the neck.
5. Warm the bottle to 55-60°C and spin it for another minute.
6. Immerse the bottle upright in 55-60°C water until the fat layer is settled.
7. Read out the fat contents from the graduated scale.

The scale on the neck was calibrated so as to give a direct readout of the percentage of fat in the original sample (assumed to be 17.6 mL), in 0.1 percent increments, without the need for computation.

=== Test for ice cream ===
The original Babcock test was not suitable for estimating the fat contents of ice cream, since the sugar and other ingredients would be charred by the sulfuric acid and contaminate the fat layer. After thousands of experiments, a modified test, suitable for the purpose, was developed in 1930 by L. K. Crowe at the University of Nebraska. It used a solution of ammonium hydroxide in N-butyl alcohol, and a mixture of sulfuric acid and ethanol.

== See also ==
- Stephen Moulton Babcock
- Hydrometer - Device for measuring milk's relative density
- Fat content of milk
- Niklaus Gerber
- Gerber Method
