= Butyrometer =

Measuring instrument used to measure fat content

Butyrometer is a measuring instrument used to measure fat content in milk or milk products in general. The method used in the determination is Gerber's method as invented by Swiss chemist Niklaus Gerber.

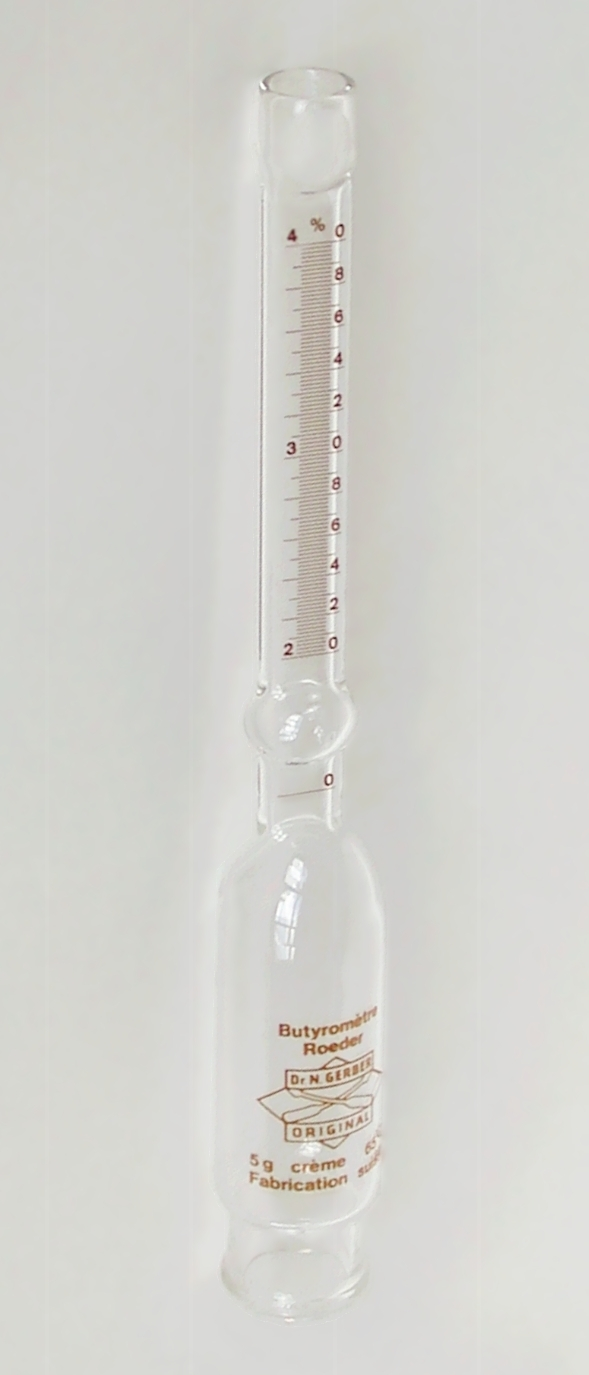
Butyrometer

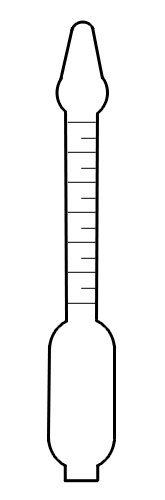
Schematic of a Butyrometer
