= Louis Firth Nafis =

American inventor and entrepreneur

- Born: November 1, 1884; Jersey City, New Jersey, United States
- Died: February 26, 1955 (aged 70); Evanston, Illinois
- Occupations: Inventor and entrepreneur
- Known for: First manufacturer of the standard Babcock milk test bottle
- Spouse: Mabel Siller Nasif

Louis Firth Nafis was an American inventor and entrepreneur, best known as the first manufacturer of the standard Babcock milk test bottle. He was born in Jersey City, New Jersey on November 1, 1884, and died on February 26, 1955, in Evanston, Illinois.

== Career ==
Nafis started his career selling thermometers. In 1908, he was listed as secretary of the Kimble Glass Company in Chicago. Friends in the butter industry led him to the supplying of accurate test bottles and pipettes for testing the quality of dairy products. He consulted with professors Stephen M. Babcock (1843–1931) and Edward Holyoke Farrington (1860–1934) at the University of Wisconsin, who had been commissioned to develop a practical standard test for measuring the fat content of milk. Babcock had designed a special flask, now known as a Babcock bottle, for that purpose.

In the wake of that visit, Louis founded the company Louis F. Nafis, Inc. in Chicago to make scientific glassware, and was the first company to market Babcock's standard flask. In 1932 he sold the company to Kimble Glass, which was later taken over by Owens-Illinois Glass which became part of DWK Life Sciences.

By 1934–1937, his former company still retained its identity as a division of Kimble (with address 23 North Desplaines St.), and marketed reagents for milk testing, as well as glassware. By 1943, the Babcock bottles from Kimble still had "K/Nafis" etched on their bodies.

He was an active member of the American Dairy Science Association (ADSA).

== Personal life ==
Nasif was married to Mabel Siller Nasif and had a sister, Emily Nafis. Nasif was a member of the local Masonic lodge.

== Inventions ==
In 1901, Louis Nafis obtained a patent (US684850A) for a tool to verify the accuracy of the graduated scale on the neck of the standard Babcock bottle. It consisted of two slender metal cylinders connected lengthwise by a thin rod and topped by a wire handle. The device was supposed to be inserted into the neck of the bottle, previously filled with water to the "0%" mark. As the two cylinders were pushed into the liquid, its level on the neck, if correctly graduated, should rise to the "4%" and to the "8%" mark, respectively.

In 1917, the Louis F. Nafis company was awarded a patent (US1261451) for a special caliper to measure the distance between graduations of the Babcock bottle. The inventor was listed as Jerome T. Smith of Scotland, South Dakota.

In 1918, Louis and his wife Mabel were granted a patent (US1275723) for a color scale enclosed in a glass tube for protection against soiling, to be used in visual evaluations of colors — such as the yellow tones of various kinds of butter, or litmus tests of acidity. A "NAFIS faultless stirring rod for salt test" was marketed for some time by the Nafis division of Kimble Glass.

In 1921, he was granted a patent (US1499188A) for a modified Babcock bottle, intended to be less susceptible to accidental breakage. Instead of the integral long graduated neck, it had a short neck to which a rubber ring was fitted. After processing and centrifuging the milk in the bottom part, two other glass parts would be added. A wider glass tube would be hermetically fitted on the outer edge of that ring, and inside it would be placed a narrow graduated tube, with a flared opening at bottom, resting on the rubber ring without a seal. Warm water would be poured down between the two tubes, seep under the inner tube, and lift the fat into the latter.
