= Blue Valley Creamery Company =

- Type: Delaware corporation
- Industry: Dairy
- Founded: c. 1900
- Defunct: March 1, 1939
- Fate: Acquired by Beatrice Foods
- Successor: Beatrice Foods
- Key people: Huston Wyeth, James A Walker, Otto F Hunziker
- Products: Butter, milk, ice cream

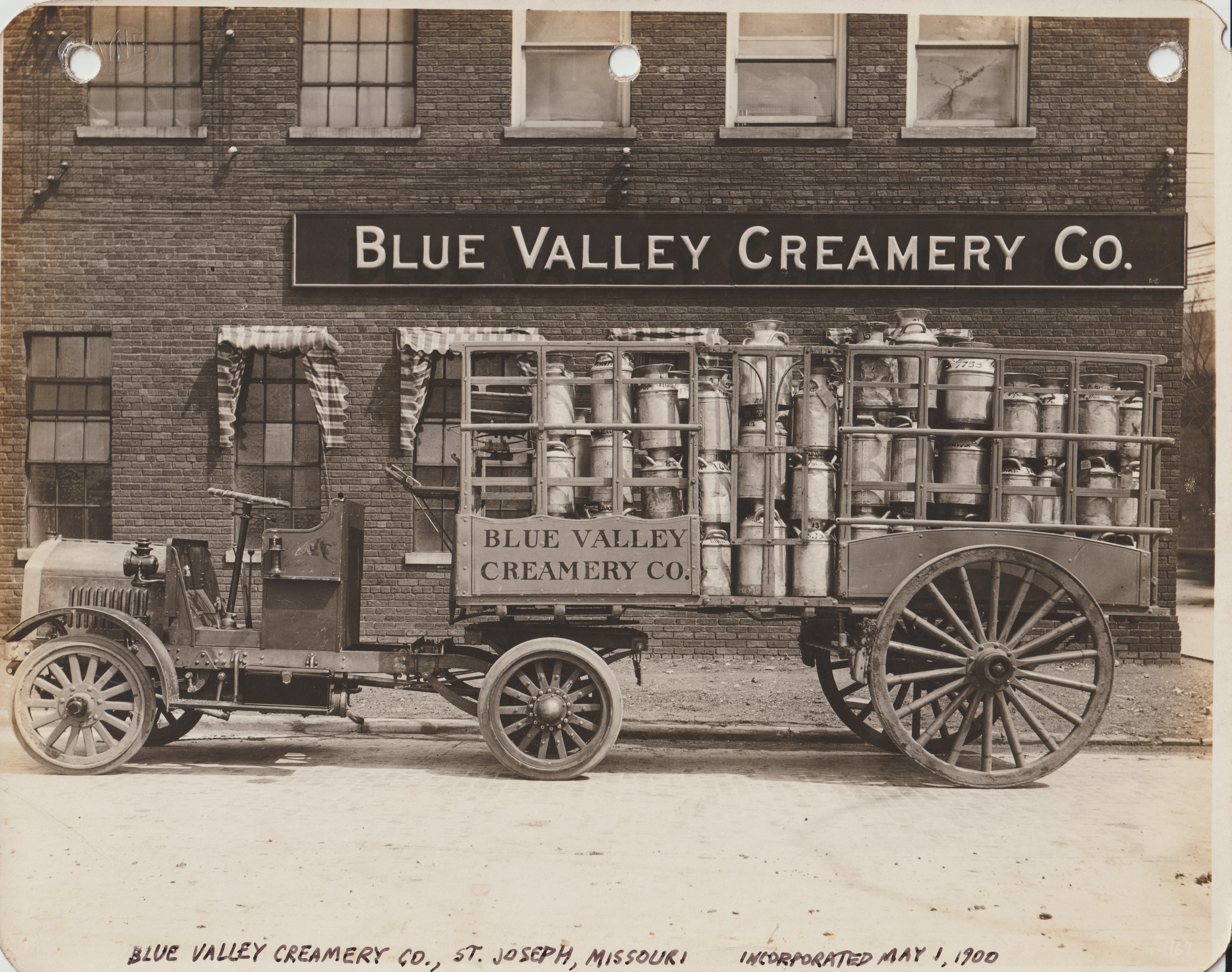
Blue Valley Creamery Company truck with Samson trailer

Blue Valley Creamery Company was a company that operated many creameries and milk plants across the United States. It was founded around 1900 and acquired by Beatrice Foods in 1939.

== History ==
Before 1900, limitations in transportation and storage limited the geographic scope of creameries. To that time, creameries were primarily local, gathering cream from nearby dairy farms and distributed the produce locally. Also, cream separation was inefficient, primarily relying on gravity or centrifugal force. Modernization in the railroad network and cold storage and practical implementation of a hand cream separator permitted creameries to serve larger areas and achieve economies of scale. These large de-localized creameries were referred to as "centralizers" - especially by those who suspected them of anti-competitive practice.

Blue Valley Creamery Company was founded by Huston Wyeth (1863–1925) and James A. Walker around 1900. Huston Wyeth's father, William Maxwell Wyeth, had built a hardware, saddlery and real estate empire in St. Joseph, Missouri. Wyeth took over the business and branched into other endeavors, including formation of the Artesian Ice & Cold Storage Company in 1892. James Walker had been involved in the dairy business since 1888. Their respective experiences with cold storage and transportation on Wyeth's part and dairy on Walker's part likely contributed to the formation and success of the venture.

The Blue Valley Creamery Company was incorporated in Missouri on May 1, 1900. Business was to be conducted in St. Joseph. Capital stock was increased in 1901, 1905, and 1915 based on meetings held in St. Joseph with James A. Walker as secretary and, for the first two meetings, Huston Wyeth as chair and, for the last, L.C. Hamilton as chair. On 13 May 1918, Blue Valley Creamery Company, a corporation organized under the laws of the State of Missouri "transferred all of its property and assets to the Blue Valley Creamery Company, a corporation organized under the laws of the State of Delaware" and dissolved.

Blue Valley was one of the larger centralizers from its inception, alleged by one source to be the largest in 1904. In 1917, Blue Valley hired noted dairy educator Otto Frederick Hunziker to establish a laboratory and manage manufacturing operations. According to the FTC, in 1918, Blue Valley Creamery Company was the fourth largest U.S. butter marketing company, producing 26,484,000 pounds, 3.2% of the total market. (Swift, Beatrice and Armour were larger.) Total sales for the year 1920 were $22,963,038.66.

Blue Valley Creamery was acquired by Beatrice Creamery Company in 1939. This consolidation of the two Chicago-based centralizers raised regulatory eyebrows, but was not expressly challenged.

== Locations ==
Blue Valley Creamery Company headquarters were in Chicago at 1137 West Jackson Boulevard. Some sources indicate South Jackson; 1920 and 1921 sources indicate an address of 700 South Clinton Street. A Blue Valley Creamery Institute was found at the same address. This building appears to have been later used by Archibald Candy Corp., maker of Fannie May and Fanny Farmer candies. Blue Valley creameries and other offices were found from the east coast to the great plains. Cream buyers were located in various locations.

== Intellectual property ==
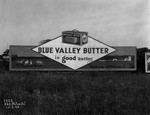

The federal "Blue Valley" trademark (registration #1086552) for use in dairy products, namely milk, low fat milk, and butter, was filed 1977-06-30 by Beatrice Foods Company and is now expired. Similarly, the "Blue Valley" trademark (registration #1088264) for use in dairy products, namely ice cream, was filed 1977-09-12 by Beatrice Foods and is also expired. According to both registrations, the trademarks' first commercial use was in 1907. A trademark registration on file with the Ohio Secretary of State indicates the trademark's first use was September 1894. References suggest that Blue Valley also transferred a "Valley Farm" trademark to Beatrice in 1939.

Patents, as assignee

- US patent 1585440, Vansant, Richard H., "Combined statement and check", published 1926-05-18
- US patent 1626452, Cook, Joseph, "Can steamer", published 1927-04-26

== Antiques ==
Various Blue Valley products are found in antique markets. Examples include

- Ink blotters with the slogan: "Good cream deserves a good market ― Blue Valley"
- Cream cans

== Federal Trade Commission action ==
In FTC Complaint No. 1064, 1925: "The respondent is engaged in the manufacture of butter and obtains its cream or butterfat from farmers by the direct-shipment plan, Involving the use of cans or containers which are the sole property of the farmer and which are accepted for shipment by the transportation companies without record of shipment other than the shipping instructions attached to each can. Unfair methods of competition are charged In that the respondent adopted a plan of substituting for all other tags or shipping instructions found on the cans, Including those Intended to insure the safe return of the can to the owner, its undetachable tags or plates bearing the permanent shipping instructions, 'When full ship to Blue Valley Creamery Co.,' thereby making it difficult for farmers to ship cream to competitors and bringing about the receipt by the respondent of cream intended for its competitors, In alleged violation of section 5 of the Federal Trade Commission act. Disposition: A stipulation having been entered Into in lieu of testimony, the commission entered the following order: It is now ordered that respondent, Blue Valley Creamery Co., Its officers, directors, agents, representatives, and employees, cease and desist from attaching to shipping cans or containers not belonging to respondent any plates or tags bearing shipping instructions such as 'When full ship to the Blue Valley Creamery Co.,' or their equivalent, without the consent of the owner of such cans."

== Active supporter of national associations ==
Blue Valley was a corporate supporter of the American Dairy Science Association, National Dairy Council and the American Society of Animal Production. In 1911–1913, Blue Valley funded scholarships given to student dairy breeders at the National Dairy Show. Otto Frederick Hunziker, head of Blue Valley's research laboratory, was a charter member and third president of ADSA. Edward K. Slater was a Blue Valley public relations manager in Chicago who helped found the National Dairy Council. H. C. Darger (Chicago), L. S. Holler (Chicago), W. A. Cordes (Chicago) were also Blue Valley employees and early members of ADSA.

== Other employees ==
Stanley H. Abbott (1892-) was a cream buyer for Blue Valley in 1920–22, either for the Louisville plant or based in Louisville. Then he was a buyer at St. Joseph in 1922. From 1923 to 1939 he managed the Blue Valley's Hastings plant and from 1929 to 1939 also managed Topaz Dairy. Before Blue Valley, he was assistant dairy commissioner of ND, 1917–18 and, in 1917–18, assistant market specialist in dairy products at the USDA, in WashingtonDC & Chicago

Aaron John Ihde (1909–2000), staff chemist, research and development, Blue Valley Creamery, Chicago, 1931–1938. Later Abbott was a professor of chemistry at the University of Wisconsin, Madison, and also an author.

== See also ==
- List of defunct consumer brands

== Bibliography ==
- D.H. Ramsey Library Special Collections, Univ. of North Carolina Asheville, FOOD FILE, PG 4: "Blue Valley Creamery Co. - source for butter 1922"
- National Archives' Central Plains Region (Kansas City), RG 9 Records of the National Recovery Administration, Folder 5: Blue Valley Creamery Co., PRA
- University of Illinois at Chicago, A Century of Progress Records, Box 64, Folder 1-1845 Blue Valley Creamery Co. "A Century of Progress International Exposition was held in Chicago during the summers of 1933 and 1934 to commemorate the incorporation of the city in 1833. This collection consists of the incomplete operating records of A Century Progress World's Fair."
- The Papers of Herbert Hoover, Commerce Papers Series (NUCMC 70–187, RLIN): "Blue Valley Creamery Institute, 1925", Herbert Hoover Presidential Library and Museum, 210 Parkside Drive, West Branch, IA 52358, administered by the National Archives and Records Administration
- Grand Rapids Public Library, The Michigan Tradesman, 1883-1944: Blue Valley Creamery Co., New corporations, 1942-03-04, page 13, col 4
- "Interviews with Aaron J. Ihde (1909-2000)". University of Wisconsin. OCLC 228073778. 2 hour interview (1963) with William K. Alderfer addresses "Work at Blue Valley Creamery Company in Chicago; Otto Hunziger" and other materials.
- Photograph of Blue Valley Creamery mercantile building, "1137-43 West Jackson Boulevard", dated 1924, record #atc3467.
- Parker, Milton E., "Princely Packets of Golden Health" (A History of Butter Packaging), http://www.webexhibits.org/butter/ref/MiltonEParker.pdf (1948)
- Library of Congress, Selected Pre-1974 Corporate Annual Reports on Microfiche, records on Beatrice Creamery Co. (1911–1946) and Beatrice Food Co. (1947–1973), Control No. 68
- Lowe, Belle; Nelson, P. Mabel; Buchanan, J. H. (1938). Shortening Value in Pastry and Cookies. The Physical and Chemical Characteristics of Lard and Other Fats in Relation to Their Culinary Value. Vol. Res. Bull. 242. Ames, IA: Iowa Agriculture and Home Economics Experiment Station. pp. 326–327, 333.
- Blue Valley is listed as a Beatrice Foods' brand on the 1960 annual report, back cover.
