= Otto Frederick Hunziker =

American dairy educator (1873–1959)

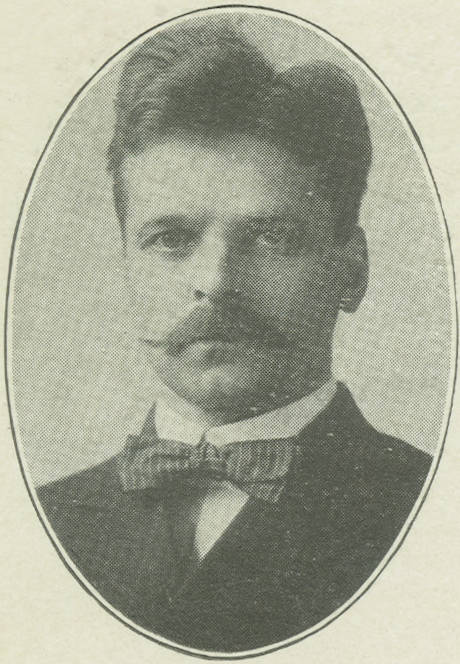
- Born: 25 December 1873; Zürich, Switzerland
- Died: 16 November 1959 (aged 85); La Grange, Illinois, U.S.
- Citizenship: United States; Switzerland
- Education: Cornell University (BS, MSA)
- Known for: Work on butter processing and condensed milk
- Scientific career
- Fields: Dairy, dairy product
- Workplaces: Purdue University

Otto Frederick Hunziker (25 December 1873 – 16 November 1959) was a pioneer in the American and international dairy industry, as both an educator and a technical innovator. Hunziker was born and raised in Switzerland, emigrated to the U.S., and studied at Cornell University. He started and developed the dairy program at Purdue University when such programs were at their infancy. At this same time, Hunziker was heavily involved with the development of the American Dairy Science Association (ADSA) and the standardization and improvement of many dairy tests and processes. Hunziker wrote several of the leading dairy processing texts, which continue to be cited. After leaving Purdue University, Hunziker managed research and operations at a large, national condensary, continued to drive ADSA's standardization and publishing efforts, represented the U.S. at international dairy congresses, and facilitated dairy industry improvements across the globe.

== Early years ==
Otto Frederick Hunziker was born in Zürich, Switzerland, on 25 December 1873 to Karl Otto and Luise (Pupikofer) Hunziker. Otto's siblings were Karl Rudolf (born 5 February 1870, Zürich), Barbara Luise (17 June 1871 – 16 October 1871), and Marie Julie (23 July 1872 – 30 June 1938). Hunziker spent many early years in Goldbach, Switzerland, where his father was a pastor, professor, and member of the canton parliament. Otto attended the two-year course of studies at Strickhof Agricultural College in Zürich, graduating at age 19. In 1893, Otto Frederick Hunziker emigrated to the United States.

During this time period, significant new development in dairy processing technology was occurring on both sides of the Atlantic Ocean. In 1890, Stephen Babcock published specifications for the Babcock test for milk fat content. In 1892, Dr. Niklaus Gerber acquired a Swiss patent on the Gerber method for analyzing fat content in milk. Dr. Gerber was based in Zürich, had studied at the University of Zürich, and worked for two years at the Swiss-American Milk Company in Little Falls, New York. Hunziker would spend a substantial amount of time studying and improving these analytic methods.

In the United States, Hunziker worked for two years as a laborer on a dairy farm near Attleboro, Massachusetts. To improve his English and commercial skills, he studied at Bryant and Stratton Business College (now Bryant University), Providence, Rhode Island in 1896. He returned to Switzerland briefly in 1898 before returning to receive a B.S. Agriculture in 1900 and M.S.A. in 1901 from Cornell University. He served as an assistant in charge of dairy bacteriology at Cornell University until 1902, when he equipped and operated a dairy manufacturing research laboratory for the Scranton Condensed Milk Company in Ellicottville, New York. Otto Frederick married Florence Belle Burne on 10 April 1905 in Portville, Cattaraugus County, New York.

== Professorship at Purdue ==
In 1905 Hunziker accepted a position at Purdue University in West Lafayette, Indiana as head of Purdue's Dairy Department. Dairy departments were relatively new at American colleges. (The first dairy school in the U.S. was created at the University of Wisconsin in 1890.) Hunziker led Purdue's dairy department through significant growth.

In the summer of 1906, Hunziker was among 18 teachers and investigators meeting at the University of Illinois, Urbana, to found what was then known as National Association of Dairy Instructors and Investigators. (The following year, this association changed its name to "Official Dairy Instructors' Association" and, in 1916, changed its name to "American Dairy Science Association" (ADSA).) From 1910 to 1926, Hunziker chaired ADSA's Committee on Official Methods of Testing Milk and Cream for Butterfat. In 1911, this committee met in Washington, D.C., with the U.S. Bureau of Dairying, the U.S. Bureau of Standards and manufacturers of glassware. Standard specifications for Babcock glassware were published as a result of this meeting. Hunziker actively pursued numerous improvements to the testing methodology, which improved the quality and safety of dairy products. Hunziker was the third president of ADSA from 1910 through 1911. During Hunziker's presidency, ADSA also: created a national score card for scoring dairies; standardized dairy judging contests; secured scholarships for student contests; improved national milk standards; developed ties with breed associations; and, provided fora for industry discussions on dairy instruction and extension services.

Smith Hall, Purdue University, 1913

Apart from application of improved pedagogy and scientific methodology, Hunziker oversaw planning and construction of Smith Hall, the building which thereafter housed Purdue's dairy manufacturing group, extension service, and creamery. While at Purdue, he published over 50 bulletins, leaflets, and scientific treatises addressing dairy farm and plant problems. In 1917, Hunziker left Purdue to manage manufacturing and research at the Blue Valley Creamery Company in Chicago, Illinois.

== Professional life ==
O. F. Hunziker

Hunziker wrote dairy articles and textbooks used throughout the world, developed dairy curricula, advocated for dairy laws, and developed standard testing methodology. Hunziker authored The Butter Industry, Prepared for Factory, School and Laboratory, a well-known text in the industry that enjoyed at least three editions (1920, 1927, 1940). A book that Hunziker originally self-published in 1914, "Condensed Milk and Milk Powder: Prepared for the Use of Milk Condenseries, Dairy Students and Pure Food Departments", was republished in a seventh edition in October 2007 by Cartwright Press. According to one book review: "The popularity of this book may be judged by the fact that this is the fourth edition, the three previous editions having long since been exhausted. The book is the most important contribution on the condensed milk and milk powder industry. It should be in the library of the teacher, the student or factory man interested in any phase of the condensed milk and milk powder industry." Both books are listed by Cornell University as "Core Historical Literature of Agriculture". In the 1920s, Hunziker initiated a "dairy school over the air"—a radio program on WGN for which dairy experts were invited to discuss various issues. Hunziker was a director of the National Dairy Council and is listed in The Ten Master Minds of Dairying. When the World's Dairy Congress was held in the U.S. in 1923, the U.S. Department of Agriculture selected Hunziker to head the industry and economics program. He later represented the United States at World Dairy Congresses in London, 1928; Copenhagen, 1931; Berlin, 1937; Stockholm, 1949; and The Hague, 1953. He obtained several United States patents, including: US 1543853, Hunziker, O F, "Apparatus for deodorizing cream", published 30 June 1925 and US 1723860, Hunziker, O F, "Process for treating milk and its products", published 6 August 1929. At Blue Valley, Hunziker established a research program for 22 creameries and two milk plants. In 1932, Purdue University bestowed an honorary doctoral degree in science. He retired from Blue Valley Creamery in 1939 to work as a consultant. In 1942, O F Hunziker was honored with the first ADSA honorary life membership. Hunziker was awarded numerous international honors for his work, including:

- 1925: Diploma from Italian government for scientific papers at Milan International Exposition
- 1927: Australian Dairy Council
- 1928: Swiss gold medal
- 1934: A.D.S.A. Distinguished Service Scroll
- 1942: "Grande Diploma de Honra", Brazilian Instituto―Tecnico Industrial
- 1950: Honorary membership in "Tu Sociedad Espanola de Bromatologia" (Spain)

== Family life ==
All three of Hunziker's sons attended Purdue University. Children of Otto and Florence were:

- Thelma Belle (Raymond Alton Tipple), born 12 November 1905, Ellicottville, New York, died 4 February 1995, Dallas, Texas.
- Florence Louise (Carroll Dunham Galvin), born 15 December 1906 in Indiana, died 27 January 1980, Concord, California.
- Karl Otto, born 27 June 1908, Lafayette, Indiana, died 3 November 1932, West Lafayette, Indiana, in an automobile accident while a student at Purdue.
- Walter Burne (Mary Ann Murphy Hyer), born 1 August 1910, Indiana, died April 1971, Alexandria, Louisiana, graduated from Purdue in 1931 with a B.S. in mechanical engineering, as business manager of the Purdue Engineer magazine, and as a member in the band, orchestra, and Delta Chi.
- Isabelle Mary (Milton Eugene Kerr), born 8 March 1912, Indiana, died 16 January 1994 in Oakland, California.
- Otto Frederick, Jr., born 5 September 1915, Lafayette, Indiana, died 19 August 1993, Osprey, Florida, graduated from Purdue in 1937 with a B.S. in Chemical Engineering and as a member of the Cary Club and Kappa Delta Rho.

Otto (Sr.) was on the board of the La Grange First Methodist Church and the La Grange Federal Savings and Loan Association as well as active in the Civic Club, Kiwanis Club, and American-Swiss Chamber of Commerce. Hobbies included water sports, mountain climbing, ice skating and gardening.

== Death and posthumous honors ==
Otto Frederick Hunziker died on 16 November 1959 in La Grange, Illinois. A portrait of Hunziker and plaque hang in Purdue's Smith Hall. In 1964, 283 leaders in the dairy industry were asked to name contributors most significantly shaping the dairy industry. Hunziker was listed third, ahead of such well-known industry luminaries as Gail Borden. He was also inducted into the National Dairy Shrine as a "pioneer".
