= CHLA =

CHLA may refer to:

- Children's Hospital Los Angeles
- Chinese Hand Laundry Alliance
- Core Historical Literature of Agriculture
