= Karl Otto Hunziker =

Karl Otto Hunziker

Karl Otto Hunziker (13 August 1841 – 23 May 1909) was a Swiss professor of pedagogy, a pastor, and a politician.

== Early life ==
Karl Otto Hunziker, was born in Zürich to Karl Rudolf Hunziker and Anna Barbara Schinz. This Hunziker family originally came from Bern, but Karl Otto was officially a citizen of Unterstrass.

== Professional life ==
In 1860, Karl Otto was registered at the University of Zürich, studying in the Faculty of Philosophy until receiving an academic report (Zeugnis) on 26 Jan 1865. K. O Hunziker was a pastor in Unterstrass from 1867–1871, then a teacher at the seminary school of Küsnacht, and a professor and headmaster at the state college of higher education. Karl Otto married Luise Pupikofer 22 Sep 1868 in Bussnang or Wängi, Canton Thurgau, Switzerland. In 1875, Karl Otto Hunziker received his doctorate in philosophy from the University of Zürich. From 1872–1878, Dr. Hunziker was member of the Zürich canton parliament. From 1886–1907 he taught as a private lecturer (Privatdozent) at the Eidgenössische Polytechnikum (today known as ETH Zurich or the Swiss Federal Institute of Technology). In 1890–91, he was also Associate Professor at the University of Zürich. His focus of research was Johann Heinrich Pestalozzi, a Swiss pedagogue; Karl Otto co-founded the Pestalozzianum Research Institute. In 1890, Karl Otto was granted Zürich citizenship. Dr. Karl Otto Hunziker died 23 May 1909 in Kilchberg, Canton Zürich.

== Family ==
Karl Otto's wife, Luise Pupikofer, was born 2 March 1844 in Weinfelden, Canton Thurgau, Switzerland to Johannes and Sophia (Scherrer) Pupikofer. She died 18 December 1918 in Bischofszell, Canton Thurgau. Children of Karl Otto and Luise were Karl Rudolf (5 February 1870, Zürich – 27 May 1946, Winterthur), Barbara Luise (17 June 1871 – 16 October 1871), Marie Julie (23 Jul 1872 – 30 Jun 1938), and Otto Frederick Hunziker (25 Dec 1873 – 16 Nov 1959).
