= Jennie Pryce =

Australian geneticist

Jennie Elizabeth Pryce (born 1972) is a quantitative geneticist based in Melbourne, Australia. She is the DairyBio animal program leader in conjunction with her role as principal research scientist for Agriculture Victoria and Professor of Animal Genetics at La Trobe University.

== Early life and education ==
Pryce was born in Shrewsbury, Shropshire, England, in 1972. She attended Shrewsbury High School and then the Cheltenham Ladies College.

Pryce became interested in genetics through owning and breeding her pedigree, registered herd of Holstein dairy cattle, under the prefix of Severnvale Holsteins. In 1994 she received BSc (Hons) 1st class from the University of Edinburgh and a PhD in 1998 also from the University of Edinburgh in "The Genetics of Health and Fertility of Dairy Cattle" under the supervision of Professors Geoff Simm, William G. Hill, Robin Thompson and Roel Veerkamp.

== Career ==
Between 1998 and 2001 Pryce was a dairy geneticist with Scotland's Rural College. In 2001 she moved to New Zealand to take up a position with the breeding company Livestock Improvement Corporation. Since 2008 Pryce has lived and worked in Melbourne, Australia, where her main areas of research interest are genetic improvement of functional traits (especially dairy cow fertility and feed conversion efficiency), optimising breeding scheme design under genomic selection and development of dairy selection indices.

Pryce is a member of the International Committee for Animal Recording’s Functional Traits Working Group and the Feed and Gas Working group and was also section editor of Journal of Dairy Science, a member of the Functional Traits working group of the International Committee on Animal Recording (ICAR) and a member of the scientific committee of the World Congress on Genetics Applied to Livestock Production. In Australia, Pryce sits on the Dairy Moving Forward Fertility group and Holstein Australia's Breed Development and Conformation Committee.

== Awards ==
- American Dairy Science Association J.L. Lush Award for Animal Breeding and Genetics.
- Australia's top researcher in the field of animal husbandry by research analytics firm League of Scholars in 2019.
- 2018 Agriculture Victoria Awards category “Excellence in Scientific Impact” winner for ImProving Herds.
- 2019 Agriculture Victoria Awards category “Excellence in Scientific Impact” winner for “Excellence in Discovery and Invention” for classifying the fertility of dairy cows using mid-infrared spectroscopy.
- 2019 Agriculture Victoria Awards category “Excellence in Leadership” winner.
