= Test tube brush =

Brush for cleaning test tubes and narrow glassware

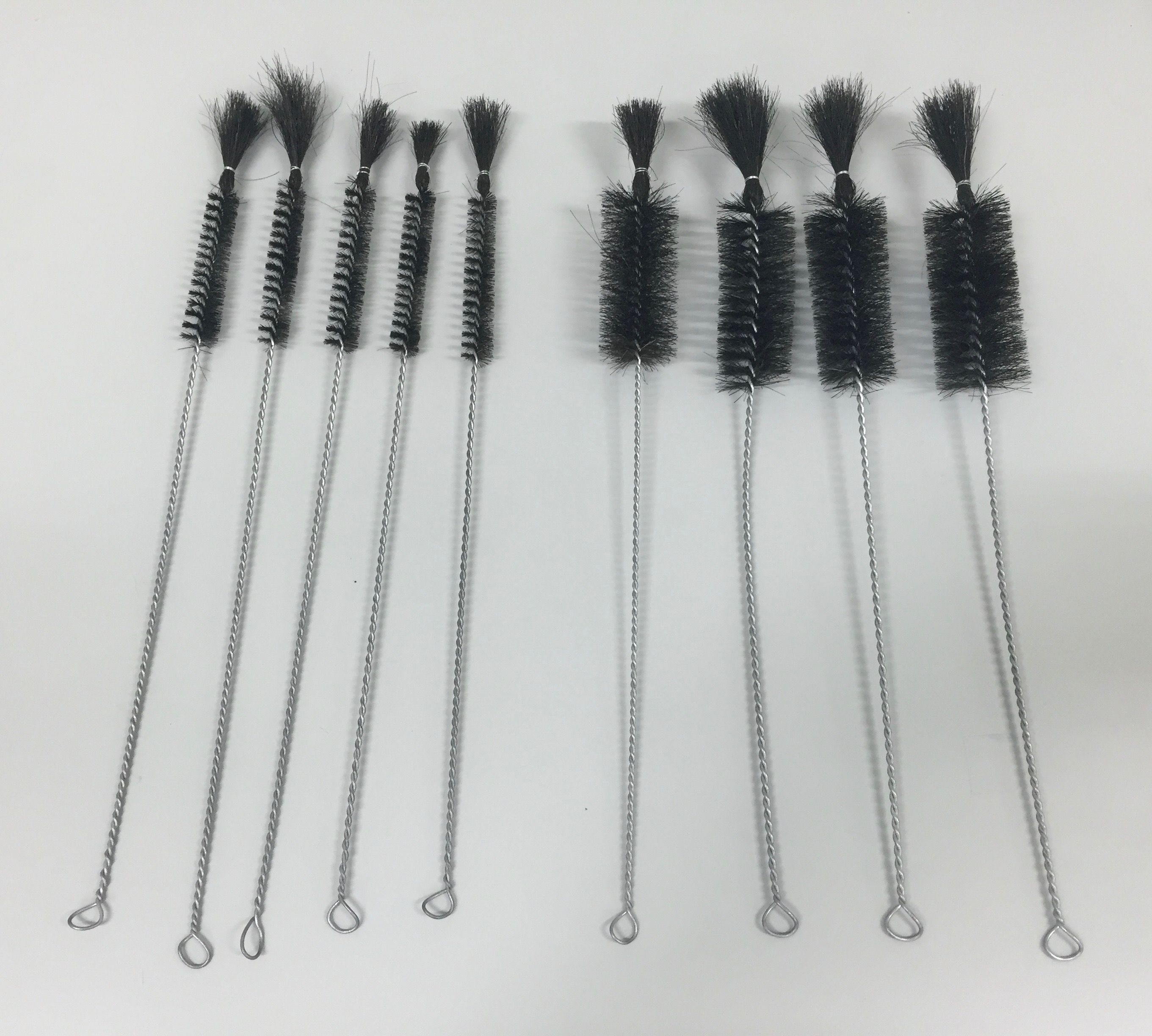
Laboratory test tube brushes: small sized brushes on the left, large sized brushes on the right.

A test tube brush or spout brush is a brush used for cleaning test tubes and narrow mouth laboratory glassware, such as graduated cylinders, burettes, and Erlenmeyer flasks. It is composed of nylon, synthetic, or animal fur bristles of various diameters lined against a rather sturdy wire handle with a looped end for hanging. The wire can be made from a wide range of metals, such as aluminium, bronze, beryllium, copper, and brass. FDA grade brushes are designed to be resistant to acid and other corrosive chemicals, including aromatic and aliphatic hydrocarbons, ketones, ethyl acetate esters, and trichloroethylene.

== Sizes ==
Test tube brushes come in sizes with the brushes themselves varying from 10–2,000mm in length and 3–200mm in diameter. For example:

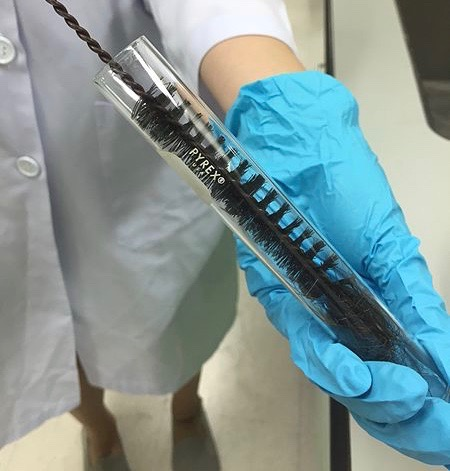
Small test tube brush fitting compared to a regular laboratory test tube.

Brush length	Brush diameter	Overall length
75 mm (3")	12 mm (0.5")	200 mm (8")
90 mm (3.5")	20 mm (0.75")	230 mm (9")
100 mm (4")	35 mm (1 3/8")	275 mm (11")
115 mm (4.5")	40 mm (1 5/8")	330 mm (13")

== Types of brushes ==
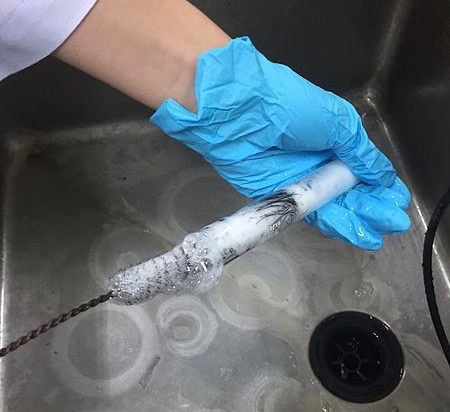
Demonstration of test tube cleaning by using a small sized test tube brush.

Brushes are designed for the purpose of cleaning test tubes, therefore are developed to be able to reach all corners of the glassware.

Tip type	Description
Radial tip	Round tufted tip allows for a curved brush edge, protecting the glassware from contact against the twisted metal wire handle.
Stainless steel wire stem radial tip	Similar to radial tip brushes, but more durable and efficient in glassware cleaning.
Tied tip	Bristles are tied together at the tip to facilitate the cleaning of tubes and bottles with narrow openings, capable of expanding at the bottom of the tube without scratching the surface.
Sponge tip	The soft tip enables expansion and absorption of liquid, which results in more thorough cleaning of the tube and protection from scratches.

=== Babcock test bottle brush ===
A Babcock test bottle brush is a specialised test tube brush designed for cleaning bottle neck flasks. It has an extra long radial bristle tip that is flexible enough to enter the narrow neck of various laboratory glassware, and fan out at the bottom of the chamber for efficient cleaning. The middle section of the metal wire handle contains short stemmed bristles that can be used to scrub along the neck of the flask.

=== Adjustable test tube brush ===
The adjustable brush contains a stiff, bendable twisted wire core that forms a loop in the middle, allowing the brush to be adjusted to fit test tubes of various sizes.

Brush length	Brush diameter (adjustable)	Overall length
175 mm (7")	25 mm (1") minimum	275 mm (9")

== See also ==
- Brush
- Test tube
