= Livestock Improvement Corporation =

- Company type: Public (shareholding restricted to farmers)
- Traded as: NZX: LIC
- Industry: Agribusiness
- Founded: 1909
- Headquarters: Hamilton, New Zealand
- Key people: David Chin (CEO)
- Products: Dairy farming consultancy, quality bull semen, artificial insemination services, computerised herd management, farm automation, herd testing, specialist genetics expertise
- Website: LIC.co.nz

Livestock Improvement Corporation, or LIC, is a New Zealand multinational farmer-owned co-operative which, for more than 100 years, has provided genetics expertise, information and technology to the dairy sector, aimed at improving the prosperity and productivity of farmers.

LIC has headquarters in Newstead, near Hamilton, regional bases throughout the country, offices in the United Kingdom, Ireland, USA and Australia, and agents in South Africa and Asia.

The co-operative is listed on the New Zealand stock exchange, with 11,000 NZ dairy farmer shareholders.

LIC has its roots in 1909, when the first organised routine herd testing service was conducted by and for New Zealand dairy farmers, with the support of the New Zealand Department of Agriculture. Since then, it has grown to become a major enabler and contributor for the New Zealand dairy sector, with over 75% of all dairy cows within New Zealand being sired by LIC-owned bulls.

== Notable people ==
Notable people who work for or who have worked for the corporation include:

- Jennie Pryce, a quantitative geneticist
