= Volumetric flask =

Laboratory glassware

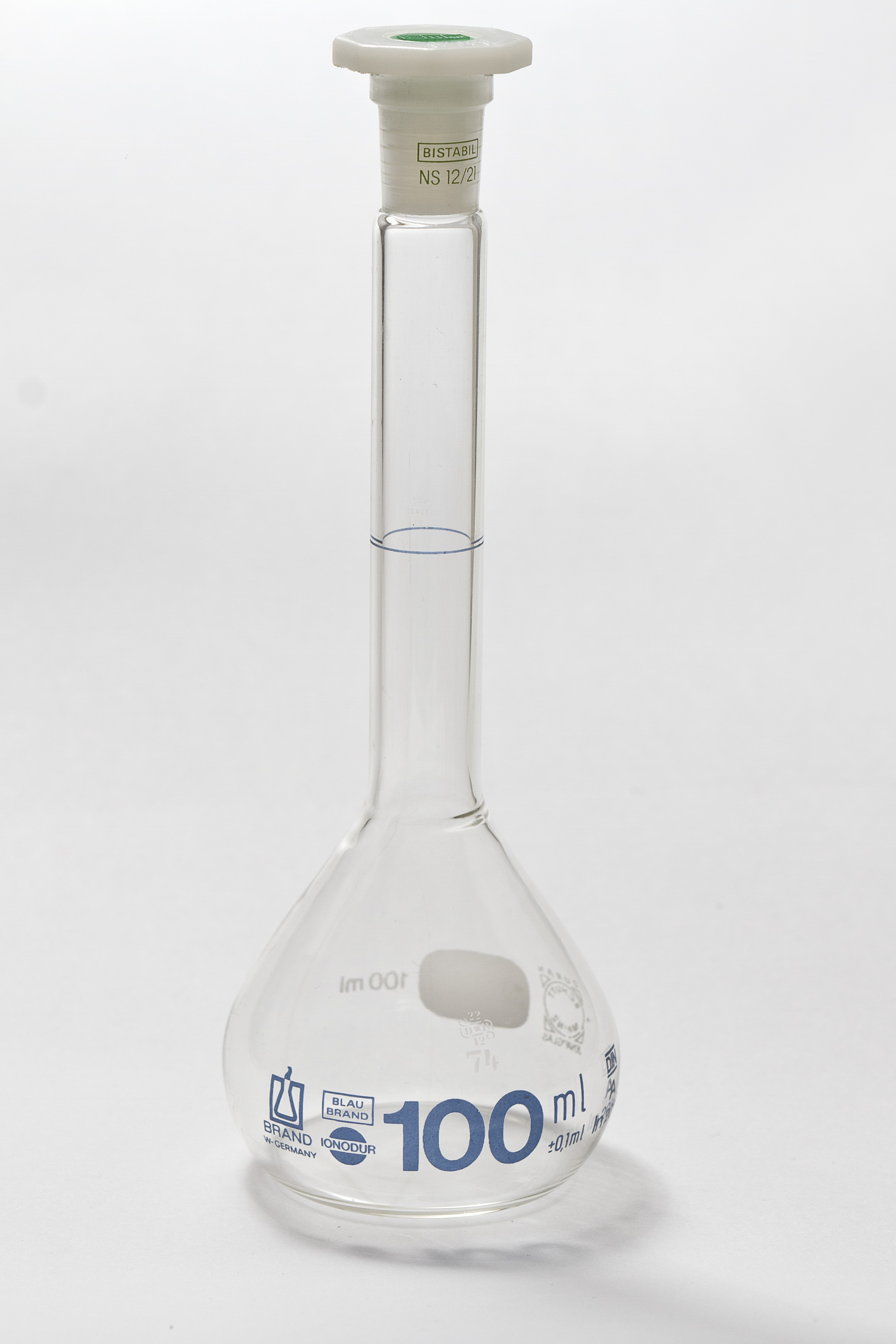
A 100 ml volumetric flask with stopper

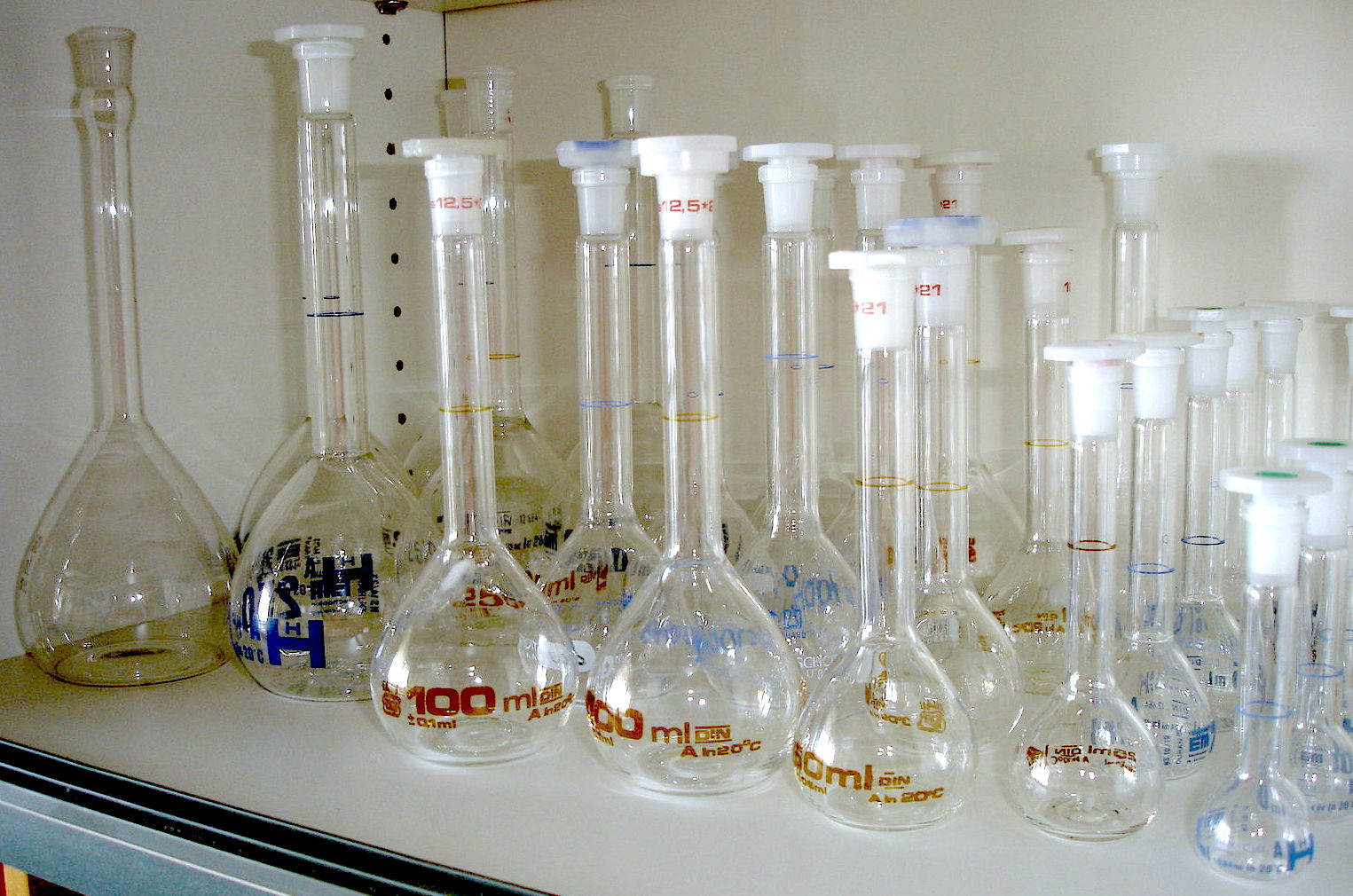
Volumetric flasks of various sizes.

A volumetric flask (measuring flask or graduated flask) is a piece of laboratory apparatus, a type of laboratory flask, calibrated to contain a precise volume at a certain temperature. Volumetric flasks are used for precise dilutions and preparation of standard solutions. These flasks are usually pear-shaped, with a flat bottom, and made of glass or plastic. The flask's mouth is either furnished with a plastic snap/screw cap or fitted with a joint to accommodate a PTFE or glass stopper. The neck of volumetric flasks is elongated and narrow with an etched ring graduation marking. The marking indicates the volume of liquid contained when filled up to that point. The marking is typically calibrated "to contain" (marked "TC" or "IN") at 20 °C and indicated correspondingly on a label. The flask's label also indicates the nominal volume, tolerance, precision class, relevant manufacturing standard and the manufacturer's logo. Volumetric flasks are of various sizes, containing from a fraction of a milliliter to hundreds of liters of liquid.

== Classes ==
Calibration and toleration standards for volumetric flasks are defined in the following standard specifications and practices: ASTM E288, E542, E694, ISO 1042, and GOST 1770-74. According to these specifications, volumetric flasks come in two different classes. The higher standard flasks (Class A, Class 1, USP or equivalent depending on the country) are made with a more accurately placed graduation mark, and have a unique serial number for traceability. Where this is not required, a lower standard (Class B or equivalent) is used for qualitative or educational work.

== Modifications ==
Volumetric flasks are generally colourless but may be amber-coloured for the handling of light-sensitive compounds such as silver nitrate or vitamin A.

A modification of the volumetric flask exists for dealing with large quantities of solids that are to be transferred into a volumetric vessel for dissolution. Such a flask has a wide mouth and is known as a Kohlrausch volumetric flask. This kind of volumetric flask is commonly used in analysis of the sugar content in sugar beets.

While conventional volumetric flasks have a single mark, industrial volumetric tests in analytical chemistry and food chemistry may employ specialized volumetric flasks with multiple marks to combine several accurately measured volumes.

A highly specialized kind of the volumetric flask is the Le Chatelier flask for use with the volumetric procedure in specific gravity determination.

== See also ==
- Graduated cylinder
- Babcock bottle
- Burette
