= Arthur C. Dahlberg =

American food scientist (1896–1964)

Arthur Chester Dahlberg
- Born: 1 January 1896; Dorchester, Wisconsin
- Died: 5 May 1964 (aged 68); Miami, Florida
- Occupation: Dairy scientist
- Spouse: Lenora Damuth

Arthur Chester Dahlberg (1 January 1896 – May 5, 1964) was an American food scientist specializing in the dairy industry. His research helped to improve the methods of processing milk and milk products. He was Professor and Professor Emeritus of Dairy Industry at Cornell University. He received the 1944 Borden Award for excellence in research in dairy manufacturing.

== Biography ==
Born on a dairy farm, he was awarded Bachelor of Science and Master of Science degrees in agricultural chemistry from the University of Minnesota. He worked at the Geneva Experiment Station in New York from 1921 until 1943, obtaining a PhD in 1929 from the University of Illinois. He was the United States Government delegate to the International Dairy Congress in Berlin, Germany in 1937. In 1943 he was appointed Professor of Dairy Science at Cornell University, a post he held until his retirement in 1963.

His work at Cornell helped to improve the safety and shelf life of milk, and together with fellow professor Frank V. Kosikowski he developed the hot-pack process of making cream cheese, which stabilizes cream cheese to keep it from spoiling. During his career he authored, or co-authored, 179 papers, monographs, and books and took out several patents. From 1928 until 1938 he was editor of the Journal of Dairy Science.

He served as an advisor on numerous committees of the U.S. Department of Agriculture and the U.S. Department of Health, Education, and Welfare. He also served as director, vice-president, and president of the American Dairy Science Association, and in 1960 was elected a fellow of the American Public Health Association. He received the ASDA Distinguished Service Award in 1961.
