= Core Historical Literature of Agriculture =

Digital preservation project and library

The Core Historical Literature of Agriculture (CHLA) is the name of both a digital preservation project and the resulting digital library which began at Cornell University's Albert R. Mann Library in 1994. It is notable as an early digital library and, unlike later book digitization projects by Google and Microsoft, where the focus is mainly on the wholesale scanning of massive numbers of titles, its collection follows a scholarly selection methodology with a specific subject focus (primarily agriculture). Although CHLA is a much smaller collection than that of Google Books Library Project, for example, all of its titles are considered academically and historically important, and all texts in CHLA are freely accessible.

The CHLA project scans books and journals which are considered landmark titles in the history of agriculture that were originally published between the early nineteenth century and the middle to late twentieth century. Most of the titles in the collection were published in the era when acidic paper was used for printing; over time such paper becomes brittle, yellows and begins to disintegrate with age.

Mann has established a similar collection known as The Home Economics Archive: Research, Tradition and History (HEARTH) that focuses on the historical literature of home economics and human ecology.

== History ==
In 1988, Wallace Olsen began the Core Literature Project at Mann Library. With funding from the Rockefeller Foundation, Olsen assembled groups of scholars at Cornell University and across the US to determine what the core books and journals in the broad range of subjects relating to agriculture were, both current and historical. These teams of scholars gathered to evaluate texts in their respective fields of specialization, ranking works based on a range of criteria that relied heavily on citation analysis. By the end of their research, Olsen's teams of scholars produced enough research to fill what became a seven volume series titled The Literature of the Agricultural Sciences, published between 1991 and 1996.

In accordance with 1993's National Preservation Program for Agricultural Literature, digitized materials were initially made available on compact disk and microfilm. The materials were later made accessible on the World Wide Web in August 1997. Titles cover agricultural economics, agricultural engineering, animal science, crops and their protection, food science, forestry, human nutrition, rural sociology, and soil science.

== Select readings from the Collection ==
- 1888: Curtis, G.W. Horses, cattle, sheep and swine: origin, history, improvement, description, characteristics, merits, objections, adaptability south, etc., of each of the different breeds, with hints on selection, care and management, including methods of practical breeders in the United States and Canada.
- 1895: Wilcox, L.M. Irrigation farming: a handbook for the practical application of water in the production of crops, Orange Judd Co.
- 1896: Green, S.B. Vegetable gardening: a manual on the growing of vegetables for home use and marketing. Prepared especially for the classes of the School of agriculture of the University of Minnesota, Webb Publishing Company.
- 1902: Terry, T.B. The A B C of strawberry culture, for farmers, village people, and small growers: a book for beginners, A.I. Root Co.
- 1905: Goodrich, C.L. The first book of farming, Doubleday, Page & Co.
- 1908: Hedrick, U.P. The grapes of New York, J.B. Lyon Company.
- 1912: Burritt, M.C. Apple Growing, Outing Publishing Company.
- 1914: Hunziker, O.F. Condensed milk and milk powder: prepared for the use of milk condenseries, dairy students and pure food departments (1st edition), self-published. ISBN 1-4067-8266-1
- 1914: Boss, A. Farm management, Lyons & Carnahan.
- 1916: Eckles, C.H. Dairy farming, Macmillan New York.
- 1916: Ferguson, J.A. Farm forestry, J. Wiley & Sons.
- 1916: Canning and how to use canned food by A.W. Bitting, National Canners Association.
- 1917: Phillips, E.F. Beekeeping, MacMillan Company.
- 1920: Hunziker, O.F. The Butter Industry, Prepared for Factory, School and Laboratory, self-published.
- 1925: Ward, R.D. The climates of the United States, Ginn and Company.
- 1926: Watson, J.A.S. The cattle-breeder's handbook, Ernest Benn Limited.
- 1927–1965: Agricultural history, Agricultural History Society.
- 1938: Culpin, C.C. Farm machinery, C. Lockwood & Son, Ltd.
- 1929: Agricultural reform in the United States, McGraw-Hill Book Company, Inc.
- 1945: Shepherd, G.S. Agricultural price control, Collegiate Press.
