= G. Malcolm Trout =

- Born: George Malcolm Trout; March 7, 1896; Birmingham, Iowa, U.S.
- Died: November 1, 1990 (aged 94); Lansing, Michigan, U.S.
- Resting place: Lansing, Michigan, U.S.
- Education: Iowa State University, Cornell University
- Known for: Dairy Science

George Malcolm Trout (March 7, 1896 – November 1, 1990) was an American dairy industry pioneer, writer, researcher, and professor emeritus in food science at Michigan State University. Trout is credited with finding the key to the creation of homogenized milk.

== Biography ==
He was born on March 7, 1896, in Birmingham, Iowa. He received his bachelor's degree in 1923 and master's degree in 1924 from Iowa State University (ISU). Trout received a doctorate degree from Cornell University in 1936. He was on the dairy husbandry staff of the West Virginia University.

He joined Michigan State University in 1928, and became a full professor in 1941, before he retired in 1966.

He researched the homogenization of milk. In the 1930s he was considered to be a dairy industry pioneer for his research on the chemical and physical properties of homogenized milk.

The American Dairy Science Association gave him its highest award in 1964 and a further special award of appreciation in 1981 for 30 years of work as historian.

== Death and legacy ==
He died aged 94, on November 1, 1990, at Sparrow Hospital and is buried in Evergreen Cemetery in Lansing, Michigan.

There has been a foundation established in his name to carry on his legacy and learning, and in 1992 the Food Science Building at Michigan State University was renamed the "G. Malcolm Trout Food Science and Human Nutrition Building". In addition, the Trout Council was formed in the 1980s to help continue Dr. Trout's development projects.

Michigan Governor James Blanchard honored him by designating March 7, 1986, as Mac Trout Day.
