= Wallace Olsen =

American librarian and digital library advocate

Wallace Olsen (28 March 1929 – 1 December 2010) was a librarian and early proponent of digital libraries.

== Method ==
Beginning in the 1960s, Olsen published the groundwork for digital repositories of Land-grant university library collections in the United States. By the late 1980s, with the growing availability of machine-readable data on academic journals and books, Olsen had developed a selection methodology for "core literature" collections of scholarly materials. With funding from the Rockefeller Foundation, in 1988 Olsen established the Core Literature Project at Cornell University's Albert R. Mann Library. Extensive bibliographies of scholarly monographs and serials for specific subjects and their sub-disciplines were ranked using citation analysis to determine levels of use over time. Additional input came from scholars from across the United States who provided subject expertise regarding the relative value, historical importance, and potential future use of the historical publications listed in the bibliographies. The priority-ranked lists identified the most important books and journals for each subject area in the literature published in North America, regardless of holdings of any particular library’s collection. The findings documented by the Core Literature Project were published in the 1990s as a seven-volume series, The Literature of the Agricultural Sciences of which Olsen was the series editor.

The contemporary literature findings from the series established the criteria for journal titles selected as part of "The Essential Electronic Agricultural Library" project for the use of scholars and researchers in developing countries. Later, digital preservation projects arose to address older titles identified in the series from the period 1850 to 1950, as many of these titles were originally printed on highly acidic paper which deteriorates rapidly over time.

== Projects ==
The Core Historical Literature of Agriculture (CHLA), which started as a digital microfilming project in 1994 and first appeared online in 1996, preceded the Google Books project by nearly a decade. Although CHLA is a much smaller collection (1 million pages as of 2011), all of its titles are considered academically and historically important, and all the titles in CHLA are freely accessible as complete full texts. Along with the University of Michigan's Making of America project, CHLA was one of the earliest subject-specific digital library collections.

The United States Agriculture Information Network (USAIN), a community of land-grant universities, also used Olsen's method to identify and preserve the literature on agriculture and rural life for each state.

In 2003 Albert R. Mann Library's Home Economics Archive: Research, Tradition and History (HEARTH) appeared online. The HEARTH project focuses on the core historical literature of home economics and human ecology published between 1850 and 1950. Like the earlier CHLA project, all titles are freely accessible as complete full texts.
