= Huston Wyeth =

American businessman (1863–1925)

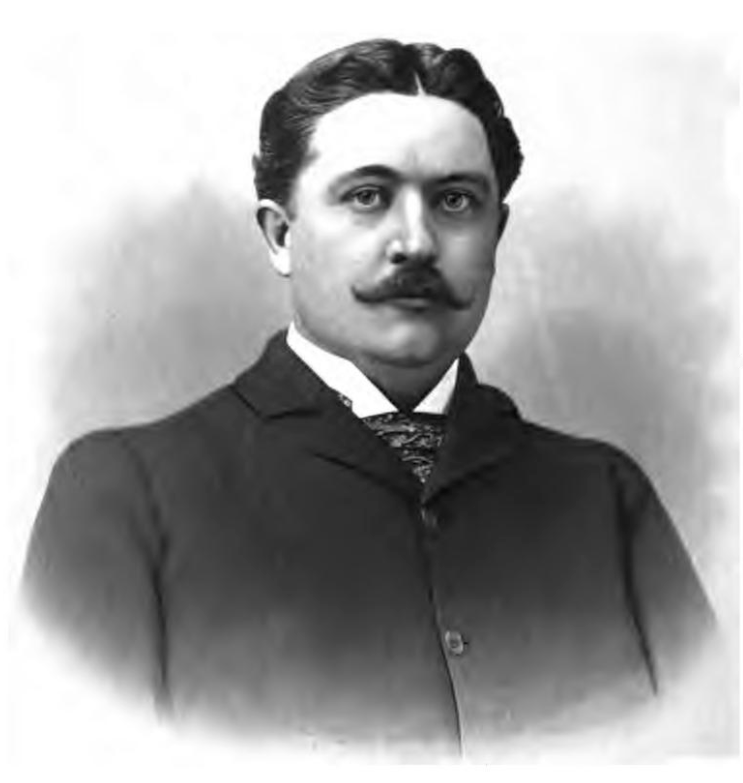
- Born: July 8, 1863; St. Joseph, Missouri, United States
- Died: January 25, 1925 (aged 61); Miami, Florida, United States
- Occupation: Businessman

Signature
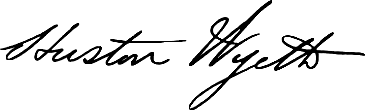

Huston Wyeth (1863–1925) was an American industrialist and a prominent businessman and social figure in St. Joseph, Missouri.

== Early life ==
Huston Wyeth was born in St. Joseph, Missouri on July 8, 1863, to William Maxwell Wyeth (1832–1901) and Eliza Renick Wyeth (1837–1920). Huston had two siblings, including Sue Maud (1861–1897). William's brothers, John and Frank, founded the Wyeth pharmaceutical company.

== Career ==
Huston Wyeth began investing in cattle at age 17. He attended the Racine Business College in Wisconsin. Upon returning to St. Joseph, Huston associated initially with the hardware firm of Lyon & Judson. He then began work at his father's firm, Wyeth Hardware and Manufacturing Company, a large wholesale hardware firm, with a large harness, saddle and collar making subsidiary. In 1888, Huston was elected to be vice-president and director and, when his father died in 1901, Huston became president of the company. Huston later founded the St. Joseph Artesian Ice and Cold Storage Company, the Standard Vitrified Brick Company, and the Blue Valley Creamery Company. He also managed a real estate company and was director of St. Joseph and Grand Island Railway, the Leavenworth Terminal Railway and Bridge, and utility concerns. Wyeth's ice company was targeted during "ice trust" monopoly investigations that swept the U.S. during the early 1900s.

== Personal life and death ==
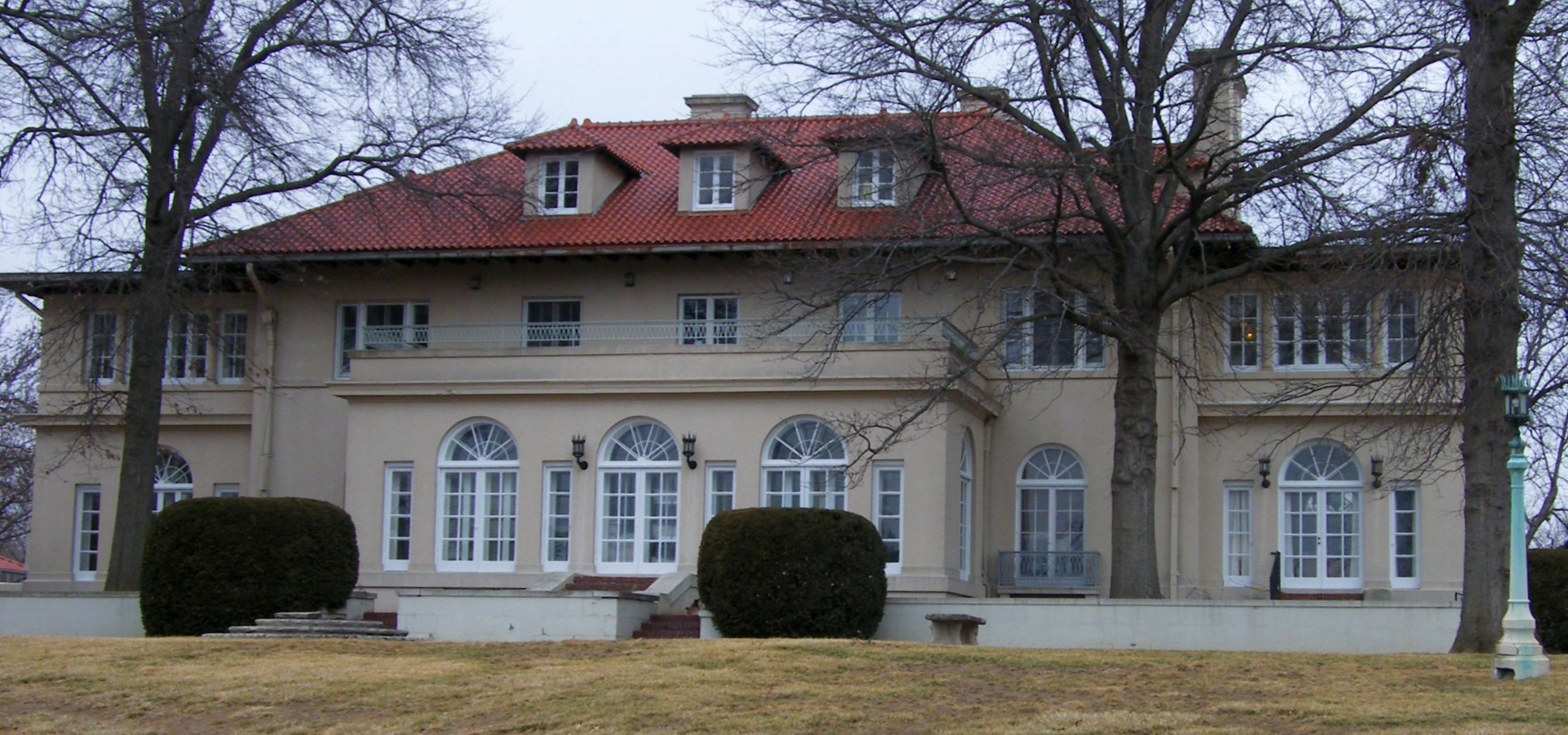
Wyethwood Estate

Huston married Leila Ballinger (1865–1955) on April 4, 1883. Huston and Leila had four children: William Maxwell, Maud, Alison, and John. Huston was a recognized breeder of cattle, trotting horses, German Shepherds and mastiffs. In 1918–1922, the Wyeths built Wyethwood Estate. Huston traveled to Africa, with his son-in-law, to hunt game. The Wyeths maintained winter quarters in Miami, Florida. Wyeth donated to the city of St. Joseph property that became Huston Wyeth Park, including Huston Wyeth Hill. This hill is on the Missouri River bluffs, overlooking the St. Joseph Branch of the Oregon Trail, and is a traditional site for couples to watch the sunset. Huston Wyeth died January 25, 1925, in Miami and is buried at Mount Mora Cemetery in Saint Joseph.
