= Fat content of milk =

Butterfat proportion of milk, by weight

Chart of milk products and production relationships, including milk

The fat content of milk is the proportion of milk, by weight, made up by butterfat. The fat content, particularly of cow's milk, is modified to make a variety of products. The fat content of milk is usually stated on the container, and the color of the label or milk bottle top varied to enable quick recognition.

== Health and nutrition habits ==
'Whole' or 'full-fat' milk has more nutritional energy by volume than low fat milk, and researchers found that in general low fat milk drinkers do absorb less fat, but will compensate for the energy deficit by eating more carbohydrates. They also found that the lower fat milk drinkers also ate more fruits and vegetables, while the higher fat milk drinkers also ate more meat and sweets.

Nutrition intake between whole milk drinkers and skimmed or low fat drinkers is different. An analysis of a survey done by the U. S. Department of Agriculture showed that consumers of reduced or low fat milk had greater intake of vitamins, minerals, and dietary fiber compared to the group of whole milk drinkers, yet zinc, vitamin E, and calcium were all under consumed in each group. The conclusion was that the whole milk drinkers were more likely to choose foods that were less micronutrient-dense, which resulted in their less healthful diets.

Researchers at the University of Copenhagen, in Denmark, found that drinking full-fat milk may actually be better for your heart than drinking skimmed milk. This is because it boosted levels of HDL cholesterol in the bloodstream.

== Methods for adjusting fat content ==
The fat content of the raw milk produced by cows ranges from about 3.3% up to 5%. It varies by breed, and by diet, and can also be altered by selective breeding and genetic modification. For example, scientists in New Zealand have bred cows that produce milk with less than 1% fat content.

Today, most skim milk is created by spinning whole milk in a centrifuge so that the fat droplets separate out. To make low fat milk, one can simply mix skim and whole milk in a fixed ratio.

Higher-fat milk can be created by mixing whole milk with cream, as in half and half. Ordinary milk is also allowed to have cream or skim milk added to adjust its fat content.

== Methods of detecting fat content ==
The fat content of milk can be determined by experimental means, such as the Babcock test or Gerber method. Before the Babcock test was created, dishonest milk dealers could adulterate milk to falsely indicate a higher fat content. In 1911, the American Dairy Science Association's Committee on Official Methods of Testing Milk and Cream for Butterfat met in Washington DC with the U.S. Bureau of Dairying, the U.S. Bureau of Standards and manufacturers of glassware. Standard specifications for the Babcock methodology and equipment were published as a result of this meeting. Improvements to the Babcock test have continued.

== Terms for fat content by country ==
The terminology for different types of milk, and the regulations regarding labelling, varies by country and region.

=== Australia ===
While regular or whole milk has an average of 3.5% fat, reduced-fat milks have at least 25% less fat than regular milk. Low-fat milk must contain less than 1.5% fat and skim or 'fat-free' milk has no more than 0.15% fat.

=== Canada ===
Fat content by weight	Canadian terminology
6%	6% milk
3.25%	3.25% milk or Whole milk or Homogenized milk or Homo milk
2%	2% milk
1%	1% milk
0–0.1%	Skim milk

In Canada "whole" milk refers to creamline (unhomogenized) milk. "Homogenized" milk (abbreviated to "homo" on labels and in speech) refers to milk which is 3.25% butterfat (or milk fat). There are also skim, 1%, and 2% milk fat milks. Modern commercial dairy processing techniques involve first removing all of the butterfat, and then adding back the appropriate amount depending on which product is being produced on that particular line.

Other products such as 5% and 10% (Half & Half) are classed as cream even though they are frequently used as a milk substitute in hot beverages such as tea and coffee.

=== United States ===
Fat content by weight	U.S. terminology
10.5 to 18%	Half and half
3.25%	Whole milk or regular milk
2%	2% milk or reduced fat milk
1%	1% milk or low fat milk
0–0.5%	Skim milk or nonfat milk

In the USA, skim milk is also known as nonfat milk, due to USDA regulations stating that any food with less than 1/2 gram of fat per serving can be labelled "fat free".

In the U.S. and Canada, a blended mixture of milk and cream is called half and half. Half and half is usually sold in smaller packages and used for creaming coffee and similar uses.

=== United Kingdom ===
Three main varieties of milk by fat content are sold in the UK, skimmed, semi-skimmed and whole milk. Semi-skimmed is by far the most popular variety, accounting for 63% of all milk sales. Whole milk follows with 27% and then skimmed with 6%. Until 1 January 2008, milk with butterfat content outside the ranges defined by the European Commission could not legally be sold as milk. This included 1% milk, meaning varieties with 1% butterfat content could not be labelled as milk. Lobbying by Britain has allowed these other percentages to be sold as milk. After the change in regulation, all major supermarkets have launched a 1% variety, but production has largely ceased since the COVID-19 pandemic.

Butterfat content	UK Terminology
5%	Gold top or Channel Island milk or breakfast milk
>3.5% (typically 3.7%)	Whole milk or full fat milk
1.5–2% (typically 1.7%)	Semi-skimmed milk or 2% milk
1%	1% milk
Less than 0.3% (typically 0.1%)	Skimmed milk

== See also ==
- Milk
- Milk powder
- Butterfat
- Cream
