= Gerber method =

Test to determine the fat content of a substance

The Gerber method is a primary and historic chemical test to determine the fat content of substances, most commonly milk and cream. The Gerber method is the primary testing method in Europe and much of the world. The fairly similar Babcock test is used primarily in the United States, although the Gerber method also enjoys significant use in the U.S. as well.

The Gerber method was developed and patented by Dr. Niklaus Gerber of Switzerland in 1891.

Milk fat is separated from proteins by adding sulfuric acid. The separation is facilitated by using amyl alcohol and centrifugation. The fat content is read directly via a special calibrated butyrometer. Gerber developed specialized butyrometers (tubes), pipettes, and centrifuges. Water baths built specifically for the Gerber tubes are often used.

The test is still in widespread use today and is the basis for numerous national and international standards such as ISO 2446, International Dairy Federation (FIL) Regulation 105, BS 696 (United Kingdom), and IS 1223 (India). Larger facilities may prefer to use faster analysis techniques such as infrared spectroscopy as these greatly reduce the potential for user error and reduce the time and COSHH requirements.

The test continues to be improved and standardized.

== Problems likely to be encountered during Gerber butterfat content determination ==
The two major defects associated with the Gerber method include:

1. Charring – is observed as tiny black specs at the fat/non-fat interface in the butyrometer. This problem is due to charring of the milk proteins by the concentrated Gerber acid. It could also arise as a result of pouring the milk sample directly onto the acid in the butyrometer. To avoid charring, first, ensure the acid concentration is right. Secondly, while adding the milk sample, let it flow on the side of the butyrometer to avoid violent reaction when it drops on the surface of the acid.
2. Light colored fat column (with or without brown specs at the interface) – may affect one's ability to read the fat content correctly. This problem is due to weak acid, which fails to dissolve all the milk non-fat content. To avoid this problem, use sufficient volumes of the Gerber acid at the correct concentration.
