= Niklaus Gerber =

Swiss dairy chemist and industrialist

- Born: 8 June 1850; Thun, Switzerland
- Died: 9 February 1914 (aged 63)
- Citizenship: Switzerland
- Known for: Developed the Gerber method of testing the fat content of milk
- Scientific career
- Fields: Dairy, Dairy product

Niklaus Gerber (8 June 1850 – 9 February 1914) was a Swiss dairy chemist and industrialist. He was born in 1850 in Thun, Switzerland. He attended the University of Bern and University of Zurich, studied chemistry in Paris and Munich and spent 2 years at the Swiss-American Milk Co. in Little Falls, New York.

== Biography ==
In 1887, Gerber founded United Dairies of Zurich. At this time, the quality of raw milk was poor due to lack of hygiene. Further, dishonest dairymen would dilute raw milk with water and no means existed to effectively test the milk. In 1892, Gerber developed a method of analyzing fat content in milk in a relatively fast, simple, and reliable manner for the time. Niklaus obtained a patent on this "Acid-Butyrometry," which came to be known as the "Gerber Method". Although the method was originally developed for use only by United Dairies, Gerber began to sell the equipment to milk processors globally and created a separate company to commercialise the Gerber Method.

In 1904, Gerber founded the "Dr. N. Gerber's Acid-Butyrometry Ltd., Leipzig", which later merged with another entity to create "Dr. N. Gerber's m.b.H Zurich and Leipzig" to produce and develop the Gerber instruments.

Gerber died in 1914.

The Gerber method remains in wide use throughout much of the world. The Babcock test is similar and is more widely used in the United States.
