= T. B. Terry =

American farmer and agricultural writer

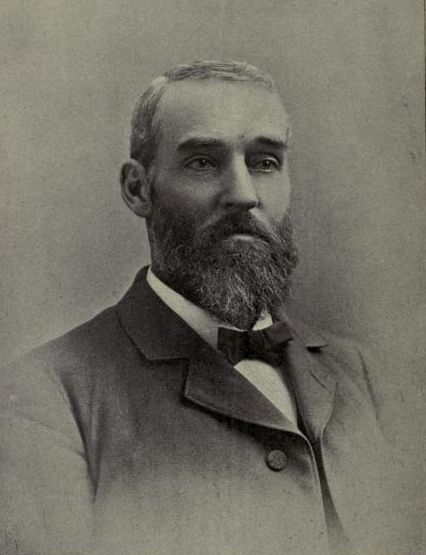
- Born: February 1, 1843; LaFayette, New York
- Died: January 1, 1916 (aged 72)
- Occupation(s): Farmer, agricultural writer

Theodore Brainard Terry (January 2, 1843 – January 1, 1916) was an American farmer, journalist and agricultural writer.

== Biography ==
Terry was born in LaFayette, New York. In 1870, he purchased a poor farm and made a great success of it. He lectured at Farmer's Institutes.

Terry was educated at Western Reserve College. He started out as a poor farmer. He had a farm about 12 miles from Akron, Ohio with 125 acres of which 70 were muck swamp which he sold for almost nothing. He downgraded to 55 acres, only about 30 acres were farmable land. The house on the farm was a semi-ruin with broken windows and the barn doors had been burned for firewood. Terry had two cows, a horse, wagon and land roller. He could not afford to hire any help so his wife assisted him with work. His year's cash income was only about $300. He had $3,700 debts to pay interest on.

Terry was able to transform his farm by increasing his arable fields to 35 or 40 acres and practicing a 3-year rotation of potatoes which gave him his chief cash return, then wheat and clover the third year to enrich the soil. Terry grew clover in fields in which previous occupants had refused to plow. The previous tenant grew 7 bushels of wheat per acre, whilst Terry harvested 40 or more and had 200 bushels per acre of potatoes.

Terry became an expert on potato growing. E. L. Nixon a professor of plant pathology commented in 1931 that Terry "has done more to fire the imagination and arouse popular interest in potato growing than any other writer in this country."

Terry advocated a vegetarian diet in his book How to Keep Well and Live Long, published in 1909. In opposition to Dr. Elmer Lee he advocated the consumption of butter and cheese.

== Selected publications ==
- How to Grow Strawberries (1890)
- Our Farming (1893)
- The ABC of Potato Culture (1893)
- The ABC of Strawberry Culture (1902)
- How to Keep Well and Live Long (1909)
