= Khem Shahani =

Indian microbiologist

- Born: 1 March 1923
- Died: 6 July 2001 (aged 78); Sicily, Italy
- Education: University of Wisconsin (PhD); University of Bombay (B.S., M.S.)
- Known for: Acidophilus DDS-1 Strain research
- Awards: Borden Award (1964); Gamma Sigma Delta International Award for Distinguished Service (1966); Pfizer Award (1977); Outstanding Scientist Award (1977)
- Scientific career
- Fields: Microbiology
- Workplaces: Nebraska Cultures

Khem Shahani (1923–2001) was an Indian microbiologist who conducted pioneer research on probiotics (live microorganisms).

== Career ==
Khem Shahani is best known for his discovery of the DDS-1 strain of Lactobacillus acidophilus in 1959, at the University of Nebraska. One of his many contributions to biology in the years to come, in this landmark discovery, Shahani observed the high level of stability and nutritional viability of the DDS-1 strain. This unique feature meant that the probiotics were able to pass through the stomach acid and implant in the intestine where it could multiply over 200-fold. Shahani would later name the strain DDS-1 for the Department of Dairy Science Number One strain and spend the rest of his career unlocking its potential for improving overall health.

During his lengthy career, Shahani published over 200 articles in peer reviewed scientific journals and was a consultant for international agencies such as the World Health Organization. Among these, 80 publications were about Probiotics and Lactic Cultures.

In 1981, Shahani founded Nebraska Cultures, a probiotics manufacturing and research company. Today, Nebraska Cultures is one of the largest international probiotic supplement manufacturers and suppliers. The company, Nebraska Cultures Probiotics, was acquired by UAS Labs of Wisconsin in 2018.

He served as a consultant for several food and feed supplements and nutrients manufacturing and marketing companies, including Klaire Laboratories, National Enzyme Company, Nutraceutical Corporation, Kovac, TwinLab, Arise & Shine, American Biologics, Cell Tech (now New Earth Life Sciences), Infinity2, Nutratec SAS, and others.

== Death ==
Khem Shahani died on 6 July 2001 while on a speaking tour in Sicily (Italy).

== Legacy ==
In 2005, a professorship was established at the University of Nebraska–Lincoln in his name, honouring his work as scientist and professor.

== Academic background ==
Khem Shahani earned the BS (1943, Major: Dairy and Food Technology; and Nutritional Microbiology) and the MS (1947, Major: Dairy Chemistry; Minor: Microbiology) degrees at the University of Bombay, then the PhD (1950, Major: Food and Dairy Science; Minor: Biochemistry) at the University of Wisconsin.

== Research and teaching ==
Khem Shahani taught at the University of Illinois at Urbana-Champaign from 1950 to 1952 and Ohio State University at Columbus from 1953 to 1957.

In 1957 Shahani accepted a post at the University of Nebraska in the department of Dairy Science, later changed to the Department of Food Science and Technology in 1961. He retired from full-time teaching in 1994, but continued some teaching and research until 2000.

Shahani conducted basic research and developmental work as related to the science and technology of dairy foods – bioprocessed and cultured foods; lactic cultures, especially Lactobacillus acidophilus, food safety, food fermentation, human and animal nutrition, food and feed supplements, bioprocessed and cultured foods, significance and role of proteins and enzymes in milk and other foods, whey utilisation, water quality, vitamins, antibiotics and toxins in foods, human milk, infant foods, and biotechnology.

The professorial activity of Shahani consisted in teaching several multidisciplinary courses in Food Science and Technology, Biotechnology, Fermentation technology, for graduate students. He also supervised 16 postdoctoral fellows, 16 PhD candidates, and 22 MS candidates.

== Research and management ==
In his lifetime, Shahani administered and supervised a large number of research projects with several graduate students and postdoctoral fellows actively engaged in biochemical and nutritional research work. He supervised three research projects and worked with several national and international students and postdoctorals from the United States, the Middle East, China, India, Korea, Africa, South America and Romania. He served as a member and Chairman of the Academic Planning Committee of the University of Nebraska–Lincoln pertaining to academic affairs and budget allocations.

== Honors and awards ==
- Borden Award of the American Dairy Science Association for Excellence in Research in Dairy Manufacturing (Dairy Microbiology and Dairy Chemistry) – 1964
- Gamma Sigma Delta International Award for Distinguished Service to Agriculture – 1966. Dr. Shahani was the youngest scientist ever to receive this award.
- Sigma Xi Outstanding Scientist Award, University of Nebraska–Lincoln – 1977
- Pfizer Award of the American Dairy Science Association for excellence in research and development in the areas of lactic cultures and cultured products – 1977
- Nordica International Award of the American Cultured Dairy Products Institute for excellence in research and development in the area of lactic cultures, yogurt and other cultured products – 1977. Dr. Shahani was the recipient of the First Nordica Award.
- Elected as a Fellow of the Institute of Food Technologists – 1983
- Dairy Research Foundation Award of the American Dairy Science Association for distinguished service and research in the area of lactic cultures, cheese and other cultured products – 1983. Dr. Shahani was the first recipient of the three major awards of the ADSA.

== Patents ==
1. US Patents (No. 3,689,640), "Antibiotic Acidophilin and Process of Preparing the Same.",
2. US Patent (No. 4,279,998), "Regeneration of Immobilized Enzymes". Has two more patent applications pending on " of Whey and Grain to produce Industrial Alcohol".

== Books ==
Shahani, K.M., Meshbesher, B, and Mangampalli, V. Cultivate Health From Within: Dr. Shahani’s Guide to Probiotics. Vital Health Publishers, Danbury, 2005. ISBN 1-890612-42-1
