= American Dairy Science Association =

Non-profit organization in the United States

The American Dairy Science Association (ADSA) is a non-profit professional organization for the advancement of dairy science. ADSA is headquartered in Champaign, Illinois.

Consisting of 4500 members, ADSA is involved in research, education, and industry relations. Areas of ADSA focus include:

- care and nutrition of dairy animals;
- management, economics and marketing of dairy farms and product manufacturing;
- sanitation throughout the dairy industry; and,
- processing of dairy-based products, including processing and foods manufacturing (milk, cheese, yogurt, and ice cream).

ADSA's top priorities are the Journal of Dairy Science, annual meetings, scientific liaisons with other organizations and agencies, and international development. ADSA is attempting to add value to potential new members through an emphasis on "integration of dairy disciplines from the farm to the table."

== History ==
In the summer of 1905, the Graduate School of Agriculture was held at Ohio State University. Professor Wilber J. Fraser of the University of Illinois at Urbana-Champaign suggested a permanent "Dairy Instructors and Investigators Association". Attendees decided that Professor Fraser should discuss the matter further with university leaders and, if enough interest was indicated, call an organizational meeting at the 1906 Graduate School of Agriculture to be held at the University of Illinois, Urbana. Apparently, sufficient interest was raised, because Professor Fraser called interested parties to attend an inaugural meeting on July 17, 1906. Although 19 persons appear on the photograph of that first meeting, records indicate only 17 or 18 charter members joined what was then called "National Association of Dairy Instructors and Investigators". At this time, dairy schools existed at Cornell, Iowa State, Wisconsin, Purdue, Penn State, Ohio State, Missouri, Minnesota, Guelph (Ontario), and Illinois.

The second meeting was at the National Dairy Show in Chicago on 11 Oct 1907. Only 11 members were present when the meeting was called to order and 21 attended the banquet. At this meeting, the name of the organization changed to "Official Dairy Instructors Association".

The third meeting, held July 22 and 23, 1908 at Cornell University, was a significant success. 69 persons from Canada, 26 states, and the District of Columbia attended. By this time, the committees had become cohesive engines of change, developing score cards for consistently evaluating dairies and rules for judging contests.

At the 10th annual joint meeting in Amherst and Springfield, Massachusetts, on October 17, 1916, the organization voted to change its name to its current name. The name change was effective May 1, 1917.

By 1945, ADSA had 1,407 members. By 1985, ADSA had 3,000 members in fifty countries, owned a headquarters building with a staff of nineteen, provided management services for six other organizations, and published the Journal of Dairy Science and five journals for other organizations. FASS Inc., which was founded in 1998, currently provides association management services to ADSA and other clients.

From 1927 to 1997, ADSA held its annual meetings on college campuses. Since 1998, ADSA has held its annual meetings in convention centers.

== Journal of Dairy Science ==
ADSA's scientific journal is the Journal of Dairy Science (JDS). Volume I, Number 1 appeared on May 1, 1917 (also the effective birth date of the association's current name). Initially publishing bimonthly, JDS began monthly publication in 1934 and remains so today. JDS is among the top five most-cited scientific journals in the agriculture category.

=== Editors ===
- Jennie Pryce, quantitative geneticist, a previous section editor
- Paul Kononoff, Editor-in-Chief, University of Nebraska–Lincoln
- Invited Reviews Kerst Stelwagen, SciLactis Ltd.
- Dairy Foods
  - Olivia McAuliffe, Teagasc Nicole Martin, Cornell University; Denis Roy, Université Laval; Robert Ward, Utah State University; Rafael Jimenez-Flores; The Ohio State University Adriano Cruz, IFRJ; Grace Lewis, University of Wisconsin–River Falls
- Production Animal Nutrition
  - Barry Bradford, Michigan State University; Alex Bach, ICREA; Andre Brito, University of New Hampshire; Gonzalo Ferreira, Virginia Tech; Timothy J. Hackmann, University of California-Davis; Robin White, Virginia Tech; Bradley J. Heins, University of Minnesota; Christine Baes, University of Guelph; University of Bern; Daniela Lourenco, University of Georgia Francisco Peñagaricano, University of Wisconsin–Madison; Stephen LeBlanc, University of Guelph; Wolf Heuwieser, Freie Universität Berlin; John Middleton, University of Missouri Olga Wellnitz, University of Bern; Richard Laven, Massey University; Katy Proudfoot, University of Prince Edward Island; Laura Hernandez, University of Wisconsin–Madison; Paul Fricke, University of Wisconsin–Madison Xin Zhao, McGill University

== Presidents ==
Former presidents of the association include:

- 1907 Raymond A. Pearson
- 1909 Clarence H. Eckles
- 1911 Otto F. Hunziker
- 1913 Julius H. Frandsen
- 1915 Fred R. Rasmussen
- 1917 William A. Stocking
- 1919 A. Crosby Anderson
- 1920 Martin Mortensen
- 1922 Clarence H. Eckles
- 1924 Andrew A. Borland
- 1926 O. E. Reed
- 1927 J. B. Fitch
- 1929 G. C. White
- 1930 J. M. Sherman
- 1931 H. B. Ellenberger
- 1932 E. L. Anthony
- 1933 H. C. Jackson
- 1934 R. B. Stoltz
- 1935 C. L. Roadhouse
- 1936 H. A. Ruehe
- 1937 R. R. Graves
- 1938 H. W. Gregory
- 1939 E. Weaver
- 1940 E. S. Guthrie
- 1941 H. W. Cave
- 1942 H. F. Judkins
- 1943 H. P. Davis
- 1944 Arthur C. Dahlberg
- 1945 A. C. Ragsdale
- 1946 J. A. Nelson
- 1947 F. Ely
- 1948 P. H. Tracy
- 1949 W. E. Petersen
- 1950 G. Malcolm Trout
- 1951 R. B. Becker
- 1952 H. A. Bendixen
- 1953 H. B. Henderson
- 1954 W. V. Price
- 1955 L. A. Moore
- 1956 I. A. Gould
- 1957 C. F. Huffman
- 1958 D. V. Josephson
- 1959 K. L. Turk
- 1960 A. C. Fay
- 1961 R. E. Hodgson
- 1962 E. L. Jack
- 1963 I. W. Rupel
- 1964 S. T. Coulter
- 1965 G. H. Wise
- 1966 F. E. Nelson
- 1967 R. Albrectsen
- 1968 W. M. Roberts
- 1969 R. E. Erb
- 1970 V. H. Nielsen
- 1971 J. K. Loosli
- 1972 H. E. Calbert
- 1973 N. L. Jacobson
- 1974 E. N. Boyd
- 1975 J. E. Legates
- 1976 L. G. Harmon
- 1977 R. P. Niedermeier
- 1978 W. L. Dunkley
- 1979 T. H. Blosser
- 1980 G. A. Muck
- 1981 J. R. Campbell
- 1982 J. H. Martin
- 1983 L. H. Schultz
- 1984 R. T. Marshall
- 1985 B. R. Baumgardt
- 1986 N. F. Olson
- 1987 D. L. Bath
- 1988 G. H. Richardson
- 1989 H. H. Van Horn
- 1990 R. L. Sellars
- 1991 N. A. Jorgensen
- 1992 S. E. Gilliland
- 1993 J. H. Clark
- 1994 W. E. Sandine
- 1995 R. W. Hemken
- 1996 R. L. Richter
- 1997 L. D. Satter
- 1998 C. H. White
- 1999 L. D. Muller
- 2000 H. E. Swaisgood
- 2001 D. J. Schingoethe
- 2002 J. C. Bruhn
- 2003 D. K. Beede
- 2004 J. A. O’Donnell
- 2005 M. F. Hutjens
- 2006 D. M. Barbano
- 2007 G. F. Hartnell
- 2008 M. A. Drake
- 2009 D. C. Beitz
- 2010 P. S. Tong
- 2011 J. G. Linn
- 2012 R. F. Roberts
- 2013 R. K. McGuffey
- 2014 S. A. Rankin
- 2015 A. F. Kertz
- 2016 S. Duncan
- 2017 L. Armentano
- 2018 K. Schmidt

== Members ==
- Henry Vernon Atherton, Professor of Animal Science at the University of Vermont and pioneer in the dairy industry
- Clarence H. Eckles - 2nd & 8th ASDA president, professor at Missouri & Minnesota, author
- Julius H. Frandsen - 1st editor of the JDS, ADSA president ('13-'14), professor at Idaho and UMass
- Wilber J. Fraser - Founder, professor at Illinois
- Theophilus L. Haeker, professor at Minnesota, developed feeding standard, pioneered cooperatives
- Otto F. Hunziker - 3rd ADSA president (1910–1911), professor at Purdue, author, international reputation
- Raymond A. Pearson - 1st ADSA president (1906–1907), professor at Cornell, president of Iowa State University
- Khem Shahani - Professor at University of Illinois, Ohio State University, and University of Nebraska, discovered the DDS-1 strain of Lactobacillus acidophilus
- G. Malcolm Trout - ADSA President (1950) and historian for 30 years, professor at the University of West Virginia and Michigan State University
