= Henry C. Koch =

American architect

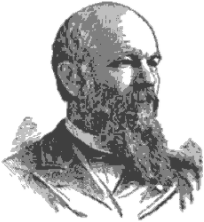
- Born: March 30, 1841; Hanover, Kingdom of Hanover
- Died: May 19, 1910 (aged 69); Milwaukee, Wisconsin
- Occupation: Architect
- Children: 6, including Armand D. Koch

Henry C. Koch (March 30, 1841 – May 19, 1910) was a German-American architect based in Milwaukee, Wisconsin.

== Biography ==
Born in Hanover in the Kingdom of Hanover, Koch immigrated as a toddler with his family to the United States. His architectural career began at the age of 16 when he worked for the early Milwaukee architect G. W. Mygatt. He enlisted in the Civil War with the 24th Wisconsin Infantry as a private, later becoming a draftsman on General Philip Sheridan's staff. After the war Koch returned to Milwaukee, where he formed a partnership with Mygatt until 1870, when he started his own firm.

He married and had six children, including Harry and Armand D. Koch. The latter also became an architect, joining his father's firm in the 1890s and helping with the design of the Milwaukee City Hall.

Henry C. Koch died at his home in Milwaukee on May 19, 1910.

== Style ==
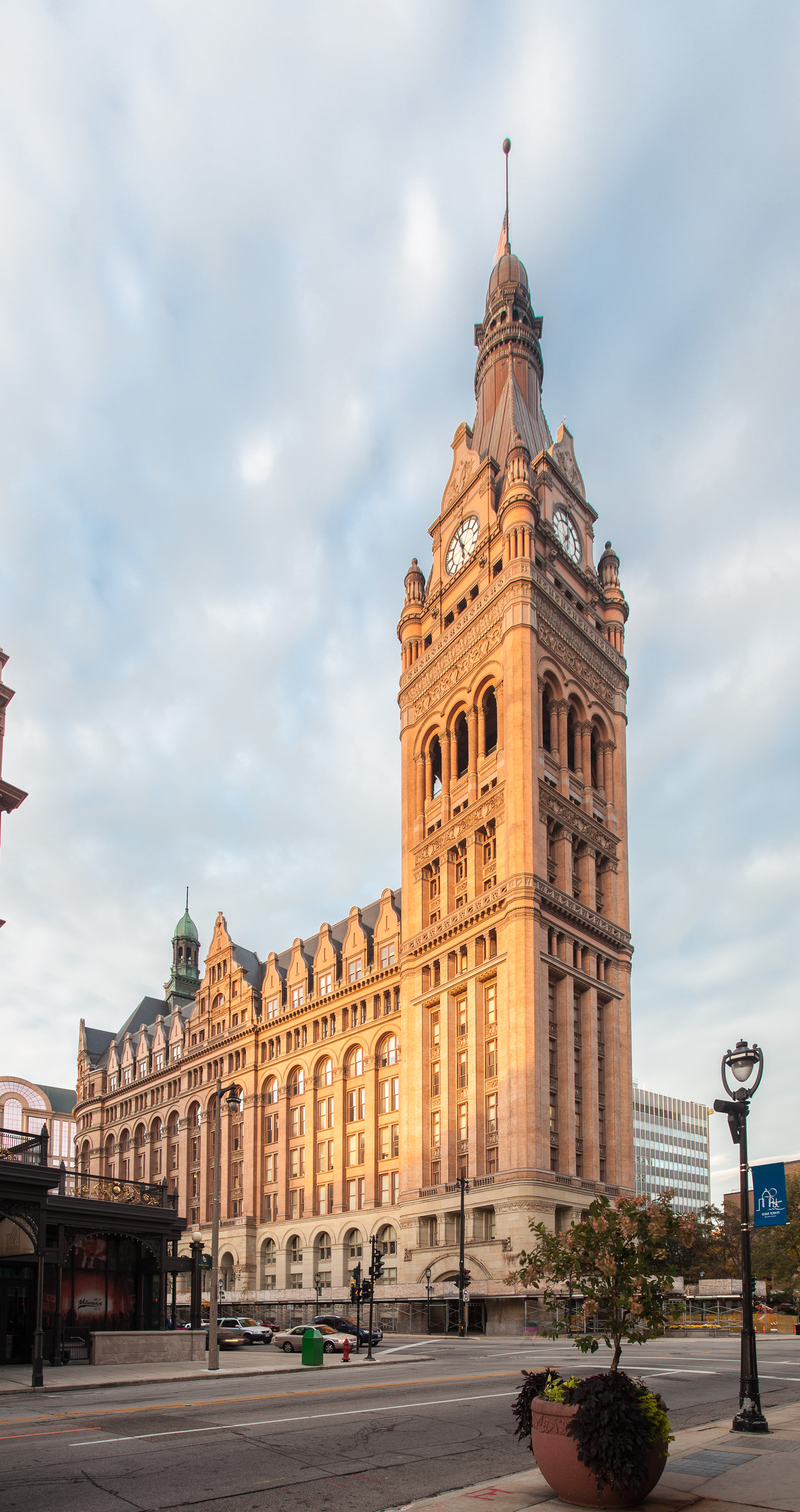
Milwaukee City Hall takes inspiration from the Hamburg Rathaus

Koch worked in the Richardsonian Romanesque style, inspired by medieval architecture and popularized by Henry Hobson Richardson. The style is characterized by semicircular arches, symmetry, round towers with pointed caps, copious use of stone, and generally simple facades.

== Works ==
Koch's most recognizable work was the 1895 Milwaukee City Hall. Reflecting his own (and Milwaukee's) German Heritage, Koch took his design inspiration for City Hall from German buildings such as the Hamburg Rathaus, as well as nearby Pabst Building (which was razed in 1980). When completed it was one of the tallest buildings in the United States, and it remains Milwaukee's most recognizable landmark.

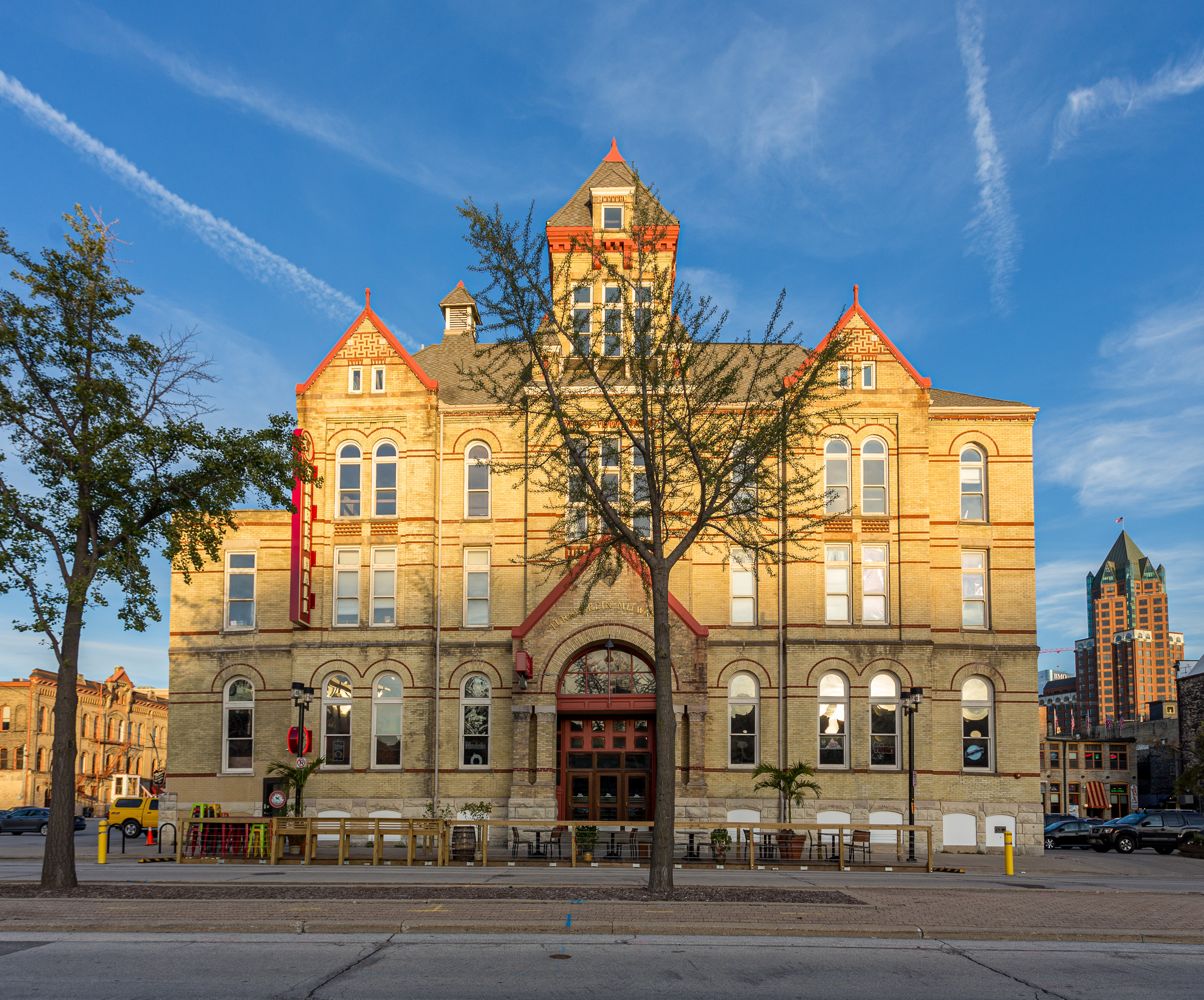
Turner Hall (1882-83)

Turner Hall (1882–83), 1034 N. 4th St., an "iconic" example of Koch's work, resembles a school as it was built during a period when Koch was designing many Milwaukee schools.

The Pfister Hotel (1893), 424 E. Wisconsin Ave, utilizes Wauwatosa Limestone

Koch designed buildings for the University of Wisconsin. He designed 26 courthouses and more than 120 schools.

=== Other works ===
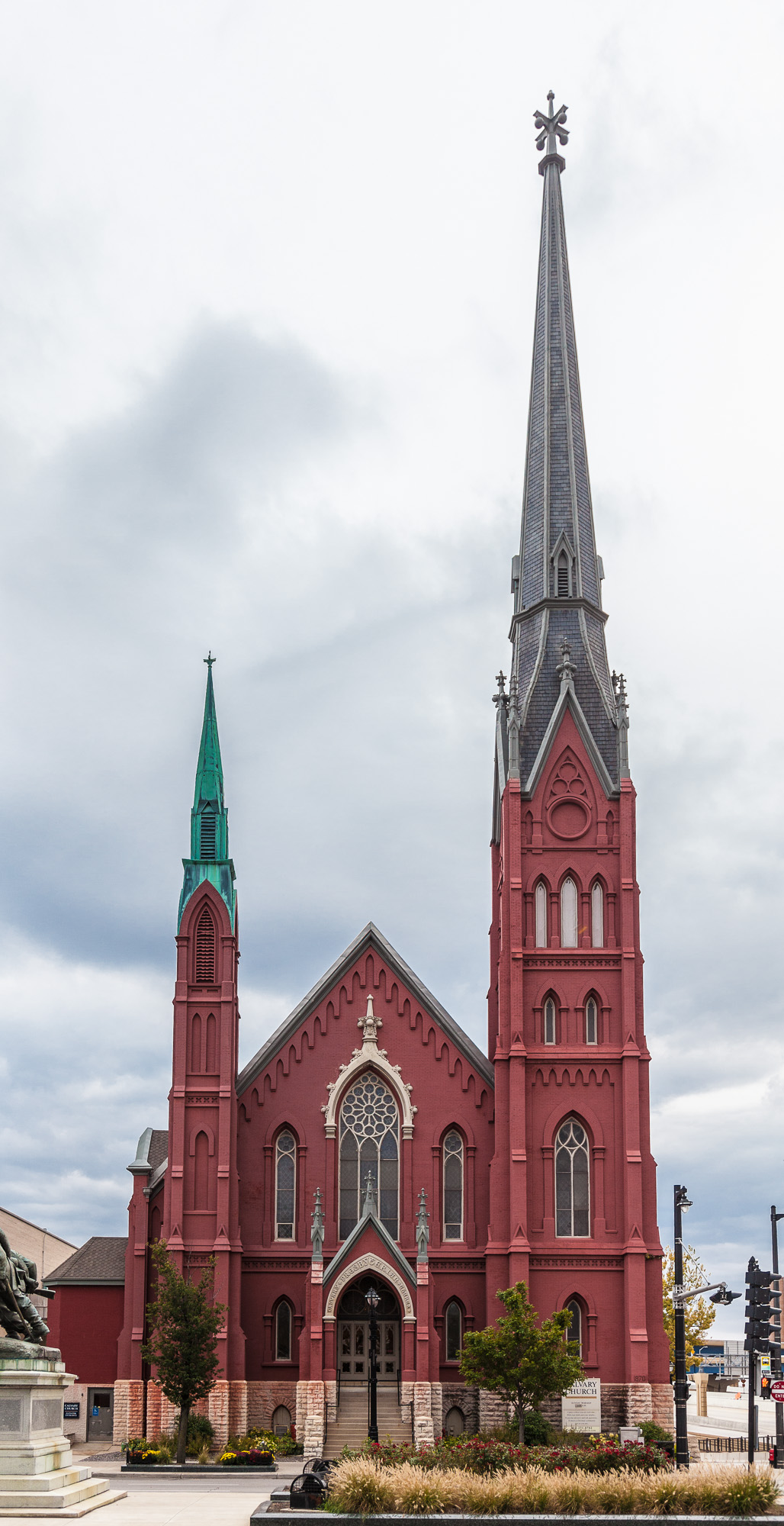
Calvary Presbyterian Church

- Calvary Presbyterian Church, Milwaukee, Wisconsin, 1870
- Stutsman County Courthouse and Sheriff's Residence/Jail, Jamestown, North Dakota, 1883
- David W. and Jane Curtis House, Fort Atkinson, Wisconsin, 1885
- Mahaska County Courthouse, Oskaloosa, Iowa, 1886
- Science Hall, on the campus of the University of Wisconsin, 1888
- Golda Meir School, Milwaukee, 1890
- Montgomery County Courthouse, Red Oak, Iowa, 1891
- Milwaukee Protestant Home for the Aged, Milwaukee, 1892
- Jefferson County Courthouse, Fairfield, Iowa, 1893
- Gesu Church, Milwaukee, 1894
- Webster County Courthouse, Fort Dodge, Iowa, 1902
- The Roosevelt New Orleans Hotel, New Orleans, Louisiana, 1908
