= Bridges Library System =

Location of Waukesha County, WI

The Bridges Library System is a consortium of 24 public libraries in Waukesha County, Wisconsin and Jefferson County, Wisconsin. The Bridges Library System is one of 15 public library systems in Wisconsin. The system was established under Wisconsin Statute 43.15 by action of the Waukesha County Board of Supervisors in January 1981 as the Waukesha County Federated Library System. The system transitioned to a two-county system on January 1, 2016, when Jefferson County joined and the name was changed to Bridges Library System. An eleven-member board governs the System.

== Member Libraries ==
The Bridges Library System serves the following libraries:

Waukesha County

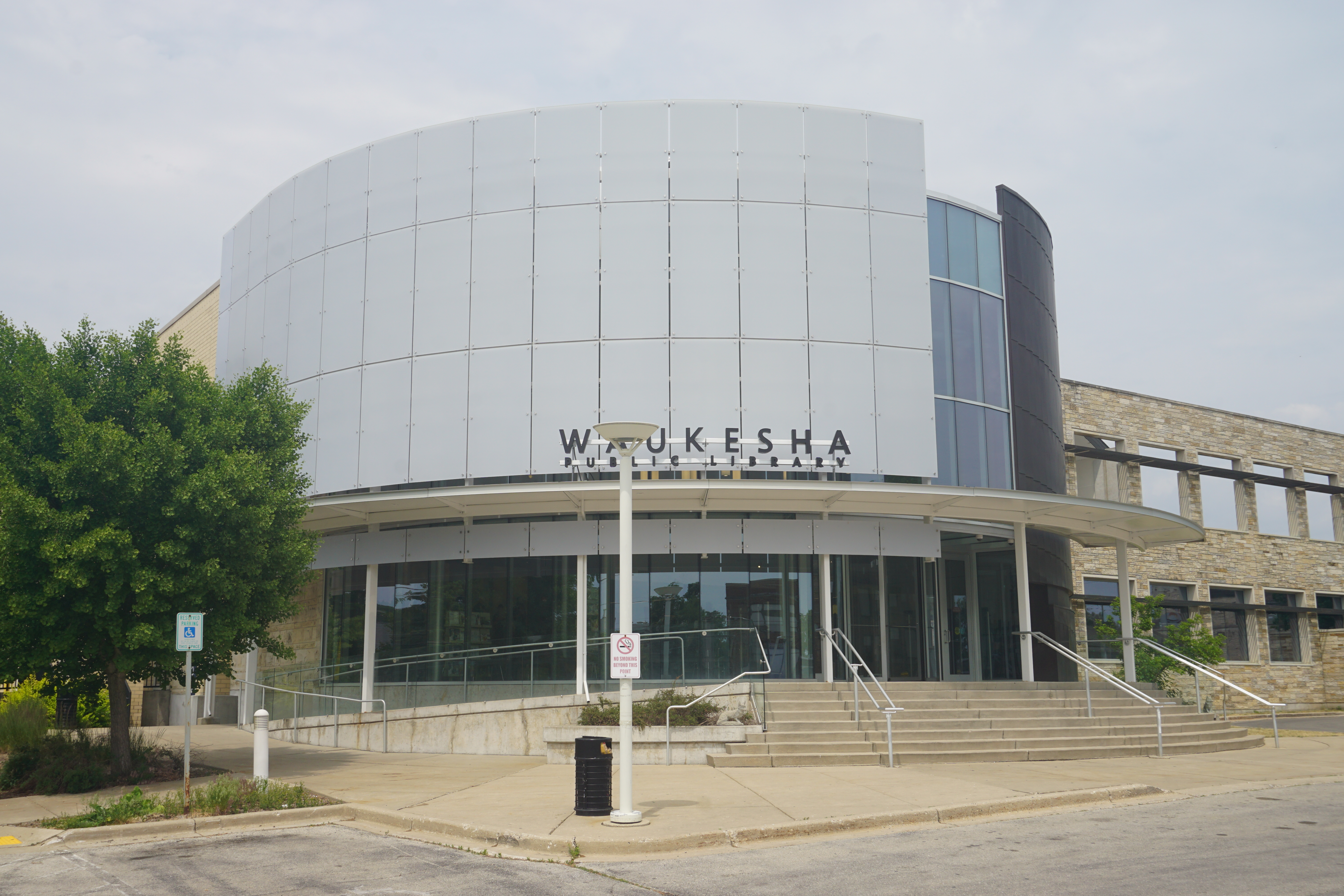
Waukesha Public Library

- Big Bend
- Brookfield
- Butler
- Delafield
- Alice Baker Memorial Library (Eagle)
- Elm Grove
- Hartland
- Menomonee Falls
- Town Hall Library (North Lake/Merton)
- Mukwonago
- Muskego
- New Berlin
- Oconomowoc
- Pauline Haass Public Library (Sussex)
- Barbara Sanborn Public Library (Pewaukee)
- Waukesha

Jefferson County

- Dwight Foster Public Library (Fort Atkinson)
- Jefferson
- Johnson Creek
- Karl Junginger Memorial Library (Waterloo)
- L.D. Fargo Public Library (Lake Mills)
- Powers Memorial Library (Palmyra)
- Watertown
- Irvin L. Young Memorial Library (Whitewater)

== Services ==
Part of the system's mission is to seek opportunities to maximize resources, leverage buying power, and share costs for member libraries. To that end, services to member libraries include inter-library exchange of materials, coordination of youth services and inclusive services, the foundation of the Library Memory Project, library material delivery services, automation, continuing education, marketing, and more.
