= Fort Atkinson Municipal Airport =

Airport in Wisconsin, United States

- IATA: none; ICAO: none; FAA LID: 61C

Summary
- Airport type: Public
- Owner: City of Fort Atkinson
- Serves: Fort Atkinson, Wisconsin
- Opened: May 1948
- Time zone: CST (UTC−06:00)
  - Summer (DST): CDT (UTC−05:00)
- Elevation AMSL: 800 ft (240 m)
- Coordinates: 42°57′48″N 088°49′3″W

Map
- Location of airport in Wisconsin 61C (the United States)

Runways
Direction	Length		Surface
Direction	ft	m	Surface
3/21	3,800	1,158	Asphalt

Statistics
- Aircraft operations (2021): 10,900
- Based aircraft (2024): 24
- Source: Federal Aviation Administration

Fort Atkinson Municipal Airport, (FAA LID: 61C) is a city owned public use airport 3 miles (5 km) northeast of the central business district of Fort Atkinson, a city in Jefferson County, Wisconsin, United States. It is included in the Federal Aviation Administration (FAA) National Plan of Integrated Airport Systems for 2025–2029, in which it is categorized as a local general aviation facility.

This airport is assigned location identifier 61C by the FAA but has no designation from the International Air Transport Association (IATA).

== Facilities and aircraft ==
Fort Atkinson Municipal Airport covers an area of 118 acres (48 ha) at an elevation of 800 feet (244 m) above mean sea level. It has one runway: 3/21 is 3,800 by 60 feet (1,158 x 18 m) with an asphalt surface and has approved GPS approaches.

For the 12-month period ending May 4, 2021, the airport had 10,900 aircraft operations, an average of 30 per day: 98% general aviation, 2% air taxi and less than 1% military. In July 2024, there were 24 aircraft based at this airport: 18 single-engine, 1 multi-engine, 4 helicopter and 1 ultra-light.

== See also ==
- List of airports in Wisconsin
