= Fort Atkinson Water Tower =

- U.S. National Register of Historic Places
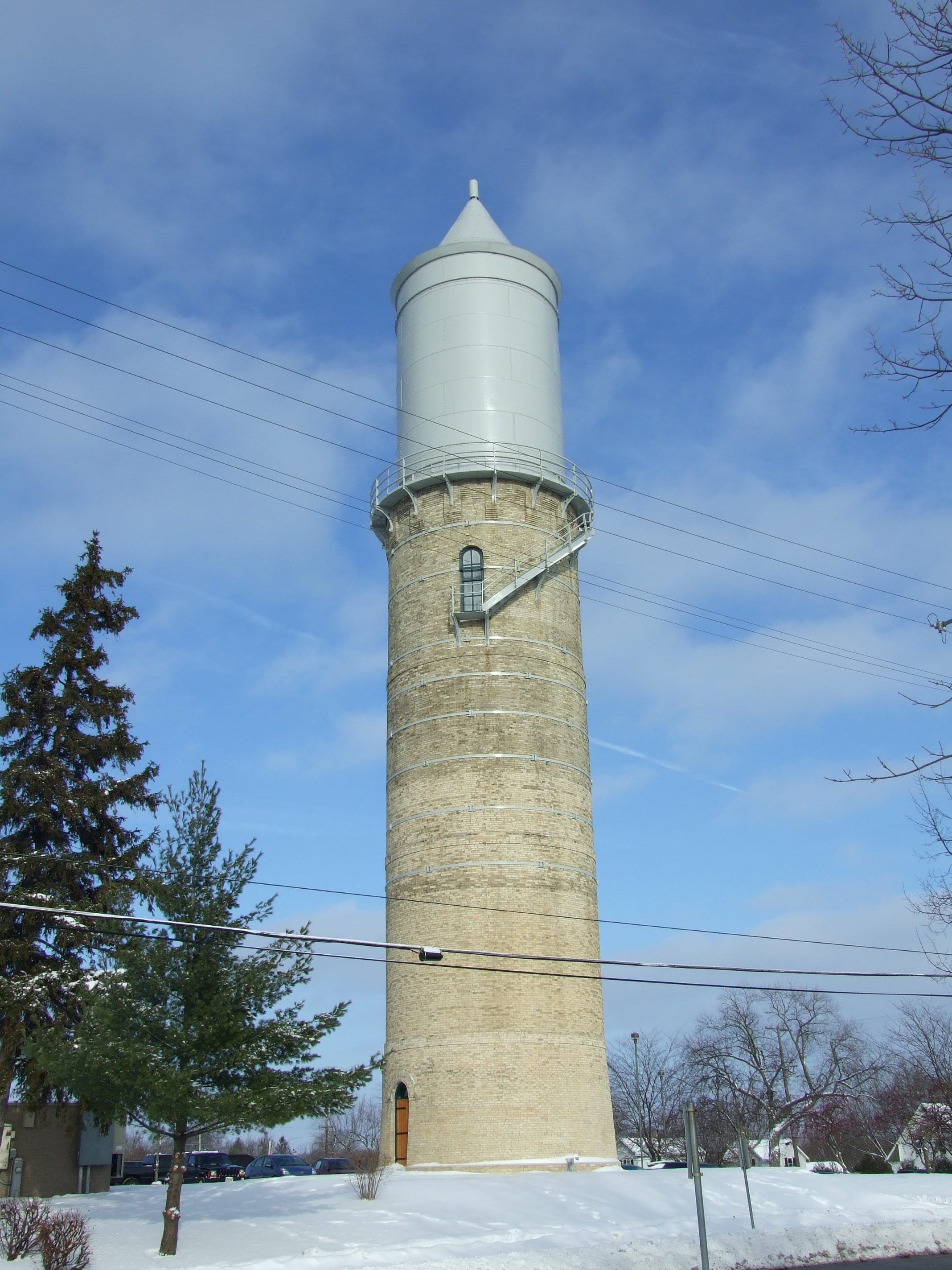

- Location within Wisconsin Location within the United States
- Location: S. High and Fourth Sts., Fort Atkinson, Wisconsin
- Coordinates: 42°55′33″N 88°49′58″W
- Area: less than one acre
- Built: 1901
- Built by: E. Kuhnert Co.
- NRHP reference No.: 05001298
- Added to NRHP: November 15, 2005

The Fort Atkinson Water Tower is an unused water tower that was built in 1901 in Fort Atkinson, Wisconsin. It was added to the National Register of Historic Places on November 15, 2005.

It is a 112 feet (34 m)-tall structure: a 78 feet (24 m) cream brick masonry base supports a 33 feet (10 m) steel tank. It has diameter just over 25 feet (7.6 m) at the base.

The tower was deemed historically significant in its NRHP nomination in part as "a fine example of the type of water tower construction popular in Wisconsin during this period. It is distinctive in its overall height and its intact original steel tank. The tower also has fine brick construction making it a masonry landmark in Fort Atkinson." Also it is significant for representing the creation of a municipal water system, whose development "was fraught with considerable political debate. For almost 10 years, the issue of a municipal water works was debated and strongly opposed by a vocal minority. When the water works was finally built, it was both a political and historical event. That it happened in 1901, the beginning of a new century, was symbolic in that it was part of the overall growth and development of utilities that dramatically changed the way people in the community lived in the twentieth century. The water tower is the largest and most prominent symbol of the development of the Fort Atkinson water works, a symbol of the history of this important public service."
