= Cygnus Business Media =

- Type: Subsidiary
- Industry: B2B publishing, custom marketing, expositions, interactive
- Founded: 1997
- Headquarters: Fort Atkinson, Wisconsin
- Key people: John French; (CEO); Paul Bonaiuto; (CFO)
- Products: Trade magazines, exposition management, websites, podcasts, webcasts
- Number of employees: 250+
- Parent: SouthComm
- Website: www.cygnus.com

Cygnus Business Media is a diversified microcap business-to-business media company, providing 1.7 million readers annually, according to the company, with many business media options, including business publications, trade shows, online opportunities, custom publications, directories, buyer's guides, advertising card decks, research and more.

== History ==
The current Cygnus Business Media is a composite business entity created through a series of acquisitions.

=== PTN Publishing ===
Originally established as a publishing company for Photographic Trade News in New York in 1937, PTN Publishing grew to house several photo magazines and titles in other industries. PTN acquired Johnson Hill Press in 1994.

=== Johnson Hill Press ===
Founded in Fort Atkinson, Wis., in 1957, Johnson Hill Press was the home of more than a dozen business-to-business magazines in agriculture, transportation, construction and home building when acquired by PTN. At the time of its acquisition, the primary requirement of retiring Johnson Hill CEO Jonathan Pellegrin was that PTN would allow the publications to remain in Wisconsin.

=== Cygnus Business Media ===
PTN Publishing itself would be acquired for a reported $98 million as the final piece in the creation of Cygnus Business Media in 1997. Formed a year before the acquisition, Cygnus was a creation of two former Turner Broadcasting System executives, World Championship Wrestling founder F. Blair Schmidt-Fellner and former Home Shopping Network CEO Gerry Hogan, along with investment firm Kelso & Co.

=== Expansion and reorganization ===
Fellner, Hogan and Kelso would steer Cygnus for three years before selling it to the newly formed Commerce Connect Media for a reported $275 million. Commerce Connect was formed with the intention of acquiring media properties in 1999 by CEO Paul Mackler and the ABRY Partners investment firm, Commerce Connect controlled Cygnus for most of the next decade. After an aggressive expansion in the early 2000s, Cygnus, in difficult financial straits, saw the departure of Cygnus Publishing president, Rich Reiff, in July 2006 and later that year the resignation of its CEO, Paul Mackler. Replacing Mackler were co-CEOs Carr Davis and Tony O’Brien. Davis and O’Brien focused Cygnus on rapid development of its interactive strategies, including massive overhauls of its website properties. With Cygnus still struggling financially after two years under their control, Davis and O’Brien left the company late in 2008. Replacing them on an interim basis was Charlie Carnaval of Zolfo-Cooper who oversaw the attempted transfer of Cygnus by ABRY to its primary creditor, GE Capital, in an effort to avoid bankruptcy. During this time, Cygnus froze employee salaries and downsized, shuttering several magazines, including Photo Trade News and Modern Jeweler and laying off more than 10 percent of its staff. Cygnus’ efforts to reorganize without bankruptcy failed in late 2009 when it was unable to reach an agreement with one of its two dozen creditors. Filing Chapter 11 bankruptcy, Cygnus emerged from its reorganization in one month with $120 million less debt (down from a reported $180 million to $60 million) and a new CEO, John French, the former CEO of Penton Media. Under John French's guidance, Cygnus Business Media was refocused into four initial affinity groups: Aviation, Construction, Public Safety and Agriculture. A fifth affinity, the Diversified Group for non-aligned publications, followed shortly thereafter. The new groups aligned editorial, marketing and sales for each affinity to create a holistic package for each of those industries. French also chose to maintain Cygnus’ Wisconsin headquarters, personally moving to Fort Atkinson along with new CFO Paul Boniauto. Subsequently, Cygnus eliminated the position of president. In 2013, French told Folio magazine, "We're still owned by banks and by that definition at some point we'll have to sell the company. My job has been to come in and take the company out of bankruptcy and improve value."

In 2014, Cygnus sold its agricultural properties to the American Farm Bureau Federation. In 2014, Cygnus sold its heavy construction and logistics groups to AC Business Media, its residential construction group to an undisclosed private buyer, and its public safety and transportation divisions to SouthComm. Southcomm acquired the remaining operations of Cygnus at the end of 2014.

== Digital Integration ==
French sees the future of Cygnus — along with the rest of publishing — in digital media and implemented the creation of a “digital warehouse” of Cygnus’ publishing archives and current issues.This warehouse culminated in the digital integration of all 42 of its properties websites into a new format built on a modular system capable of capitalizing on each properties’ strengths in its markets. The digital integration utilized the latest design and technology integrating all of its platforms, including print, video, social media, expositions and custom design.

== Markets ==
The company is made up of three Affinity Groups - Residential, Aviation, and Technology.
