= David Whitney Curtis =

19th century American politician

David W. Curtis
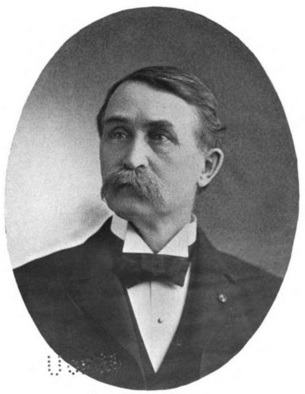

Member of the Wisconsin State Assembly from the Jefferson 3rd district
- In office January 3, 1876 – January 1, 1877
- Preceded by: James W. Ostrander
- Succeeded by: Adolf Scheuber

Personal details
- Born: November 4, 1833 Chelsea, Vermont, U.S.
- Died: April 18, 1897 (aged 63) Fort Atkinson, Wisconsin, U.S.
- Resting place: Evergreen Cemetery, Fort Atkinson, Wisconsin
- Party: Republican
- Spouse: Jane A. Howard (m. 1860–1897)
- Children: Harry H. Curtis^{(b. 1866; died 1938)}; Anna Belle (Haumerson)^{(b. 1870; died 1925)}

Military service
- Allegiance: United States
- Branch/service: United States Volunteers; Union Army
- Years of service: 1862–1865
- Rank: Captain, USV
- Unit: 29th Reg. Wis. Vol. Infantry
- Battles/wars: American Civil War: Vicksburg campaign; Yazoo Pass expedition; Battle of Grand Gulf; Battle of Port Gibson; Battle of Champion Hill; Siege of Vicksburg; Jackson Expedition; Red River campaign; Battle of Mansfield; Mobile campaign

David Whitney Curtis (November 14, 1833 – April 18, 1897) was an American farmer, businessman, and Wisconsin pioneer. He served one term in the Wisconsin State Assembly, representing southern Jefferson County. He also served as a Union Army officer during the American Civil War.

== Early life ==
Curtis was born on November 14, 1833, in Chelsea, Vermont. He received a common school education in Vermont before coming to the Wisconsin Territory as a child with his parents in 1845. His parents settled on a plot of timber land in what is now the town of Jefferson, in Jefferson County, Wisconsin. David worked to help his father clear land and establish a farm and attended school in the Winters. When he reached adulthood, he apprenticed as a mason and earned a qualification as a teacher. He worked as a teacher, plasterer, and bricklayer through the late 1840s and early 1850s.

Around 1856, he joined a company of young men from Prairie du Chien, Wisconsin, making an expedition to the Nebraska Territory, and stayed for two years at Nemaha County, Nebraska Territory, before returning to Wisconsin in 1859. He married in 1860 and returned to his father's farmstead, where he remained until the outbreak of the Civil War.

== Military career ==
During the summer of 1862, in the midst of the American Civil War, Curtis assisted in raising a company of volunteers for service with the Union Army. He was elected first lieutenant of the company, which was enrolled as Company D in the 29th Wisconsin Infantry Regiment. The regiment mustered into service in September 1862. The regiment proceeded down the Mississippi River to Helena, Arkansas, where they were engaged in a brief expedition up the Arkansas River under General Alvin Peterson Hovey.

They were subsequently engaged in several skirmishes and battles along the Mississippi River below Vicksburg, Mississippi, in support of the Vicksburg campaign. They were heavily engaged in the Battle of Champion Hill and were then entrenched in the Siege of Vicksburg through June. The regiment subsequently joined the Jackson Expedition, then worked on consolidating the Union position in southern Mississippi.

The regiment suffered significantly from disease and a wave of resignations occurred at Vicksburg, including their colonel, Charles R. Gill. Others were absent for months at a time. Due to the depleted ranks of officers in the regiment, Whitney was appointed acting captain of Company A, and served in that capacity until some of the ill Company A officers were able to return to duty in April 1864. He led the company during their actions in the Red River campaign into Louisiana.

In the fall of 1864, Curtis was detailed to cartography, quartermaster, and ordinance officer duties on the staff of Brigadier General James R. Slack, where he remained through most of the remainder of the war, including the Mobile campaign. He was promoted to captain and assistant quartermaster on May 30, 1865, before mustering out of service a month later, on July 28.

== Business and political career ==
After the war Curtis became active in business and was a partner in Cornish & Curtis, a lumber, grain, and produce business. They prospered in the manufacture of farm machinery and dairy product packaging, with their key product being a rectangular butter churn, which was exported around the country. The partnership later extended to Walter S. Greene, and continued to operate under the name Cornish, Curtis & Greene, beyond the deaths of all 3 original partners.

Curtis served as Secretary of the Wisconsin Dairymen's Association from 1875 to 1897.

Curtis was actively involved in the Republican Party of Wisconsin was elected to the Wisconsin State Assembly from Jefferson County's 3rd Assembly district (the southern half of the county) in 1875. He was not a candidate for re-election in 1876. After leaving office, he was appointed an aide on the Wisconsin National Guard staff of Governors William E. Smith and William D. Hoard as Chief Engineer with the rank of colonel. Curtis was active in the Grand Army of the Republic, and served as assistant quartermaster general of the Wisconsin Department. In 1894-95 he was a member of the Republican State Central Committee.

== Death and burial ==
Curtis died in Fort Atkinson, Wisconsin, on April 18, 1897. He was buried at Evergreen Cemetery in Fort Atkinson.

== Personal life and family ==
David W. Curtis was a descendant of several pioneer families of Vermont and Massachusetts. He was named for his maternal grandfather David Whitney of Pepperell, Massachusetts.

On November 16, 1860, he married Jane A. Howard, who was born in Albany, New York, but was then residing at Hebron, Wisconsin. They had two children together:

- Harry H. Curtis (1866-1938) worked in his father's business as a plant manager, and, after inheriting his father's ownership stake in the company consolidated with other interests as the Creamery Package Company. He also was president of the James Manufacturing Co. and director of the First National Bank of Fort Atkinson.
- Anna Belle Curtis (1870-1925) married Anthony F. Haumerson.

== Legacy ==
His home, the David W. and Jane Curtis House was added to the National Register of Historic Places in 2009.

== Electoral history ==
=== Wisconsin Assembly (1875) ===
Wisconsin Assembly, Jefferson 3rd District Election, 1875
Party	Candidate	Votes	%	±%
General Election, November 2, 1875
Republican	David W. Curtis	1,245	52.69%	+1.56%
Democratic	Albert Winslow	1,118	47.31%	
Plurality		127	5.37%	+3.11%
Total votes		2,363	100.0%	+18.80%
Republican hold				

Wisconsin State Assembly
Preceded by James W. Ostrander	Member of the Wisconsin State Assembly from the Jefferson 3rd district January 3, 1876 – January 1, 1877	Succeeded by Adolph Scheuber
