= Dwight Foster Public Library =

American public library founded 1892

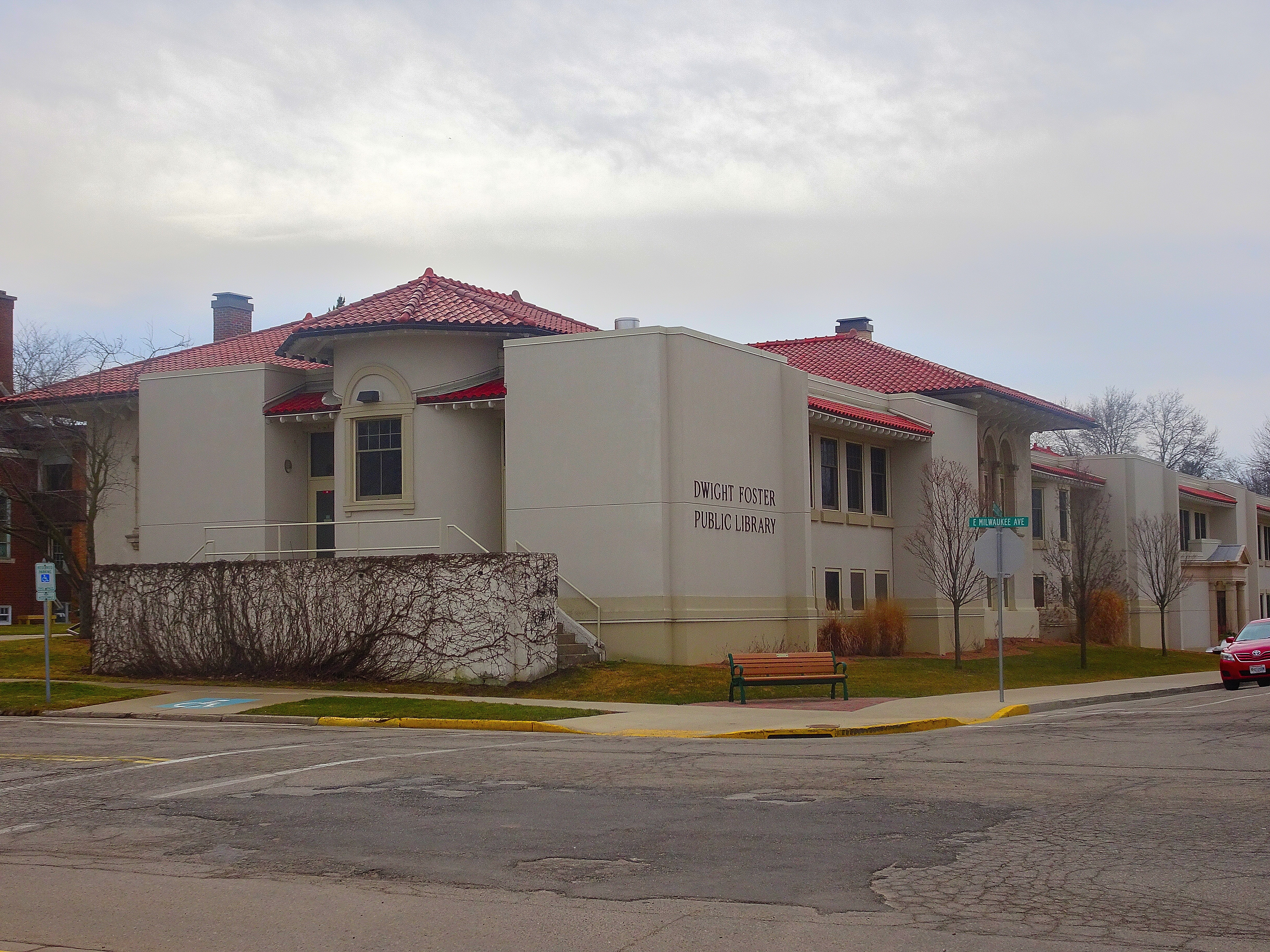
- 42.92637787096602°N 88.83503886558039°W
- Location: 209 Merchants Avenue; Fort Atkinson, Wisconsin, United States
- Type: Public
- Established: 1892
- Branch of: Bridges Library System

Access and use
- Population served: 21,829

Other information
- Website: www.fortlibrary.org

Dwight Foster Public Library is a public library in Fort Atkinson, Wisconsin.

Established in 1892, the Foster Library serves Fort Atkinson and surrounding communities. The total service population was 21,829 in 2016. The library serves as the resource library for Jefferson County, is a member of the Bridges Library System.

== Early history ==
The idea for a public library in Fort Atkinson was first broached by two local women's clubs who used State Historical Library in Madison for research on their book topics. It was also discussed at a local meeting of the Women's Christian Temperance Union on November 4, 1889.

On March 10, 1890, the twenty-one women present pledged to raise $100 towards a new library. At the W.C.T.U. meeting on December 7, 1891, Mrs. W. H. Rogers, president of the society, acted as chairman and appointed a committee to petition the city council to ask the voters to appropriate $500 for a free public library.

On January 4, 1892, the City of Fort Atkinson voted to spend $500 for library purposes. However, the city council discovered there was no money left in the city treasury. In response, on January 12, 1892, at a W.C.T.U. meeting, a committee was appointed to raise the $500. The W.C.TU. donated $100 and in a few months the $500 was pledged. By May 21, 1892, they had raised $80 through cost suppers, $20 by donations and $400 from the pledges. On May 25, 1892, the city agreed to fund equipment and maintenance and the city's public library officially commenced.

== Building history ==
Fort Atkinson's first library was located at 115 South Main Street, at the northeast corner of Main Street and East Milwaukee, on the second floor of the Wigdale building .

In March 1901, the library committee voted to request a donation from Andrew Carnegie, but no reply to their letter was received. In 1904, the committee again wrote to Carnegie, asking for $10,000. His private secretary responded, saying that Carnegie felt the current library facilities were adequate. Thus, this public library is not a Carnegie library.

In 1910, the library board decided to move the library into more spacious quarters in its own building. In 1910, the city purchased the new property for $3,000. Land south of the library was purchased in 1911.

In 1912, Henry E. Southwell gave the city $10,000 for the purchase of a new library building, stipulating that it be named after Dwight Foster, his father-in-law and the founder of Fort Atkinson. In the spring of 1915, the city council appropriated $4,000 toward the new building and later added an additional $1,100. The Hoard residence, which had housed the library, was moved to a new location on Bluff Street and the new library was built on the old site. The new library was dedicated on October 13, 1916. The total cost was $16,695.23. A clipping from the Milwaukee Sentinel of Sunday, October 1, 1916, commented on the new library. It said that the building was unique in design and that the arrangement was ideal for a small library. "The building is of cement and hollow tile, Kellastone outside finish of green granite and red tile roof."

On January 27, 1929, there was an announcement at a special meeting of the library board that the daughter of Mr. Henry E. and Mrs. Celeste A. Foster Southwell, Mrs. Mary Worcester, was donating $25,000 for a children's wing, with its own entrance to avoid disturbance to those doing research. Her only stipulation was that the architect's plans were to be submitted to her first and the new wing was to be called the Celeste A. Foster Southwell Memorial Wing. The new children's wing was dedicated January 28, 1931. The total value of the library was then estimated at $77,000.

The library was housed in this building until the early 1980s; it had become increasingly overcrowded. In 1981 the library board did a feasibility study on expansion. A design that more than doubled the total floor space to 21,000 square feet was approved. The cost was estimated at $600,000 and half the funds were successfully raised from private sources. The expansion was completed in 1983.

A third expansion was completed in 2011. An addition of 12,000 square feet and reconfiguration took place from March 2010. The project was completed in ten months while the library operated at a temporary location. On February 1, 2011, the newly renovated and expanded (to 33,000 square feet) library reopened. The project cost $5.5 million.

== Other History ==
In 2017, Dwight Foster Public Library presented a series of programs based on Atul Gawande's book "Being Mortal," and held a number of fundraisers and other programs as well. Artist Marcus Tauch's art has been featured in public display at the Dwight Foster Public Library. In 2020 the library hosted a discussion of "Such Anxious Hours: Wisconsin Women’s Voices From the Civil War," as well as a travel series.
