= Calvary Presbyterian Church (Milwaukee) =

Historic church in Wisconsin, United States

- U.S. National Register of Historic Places
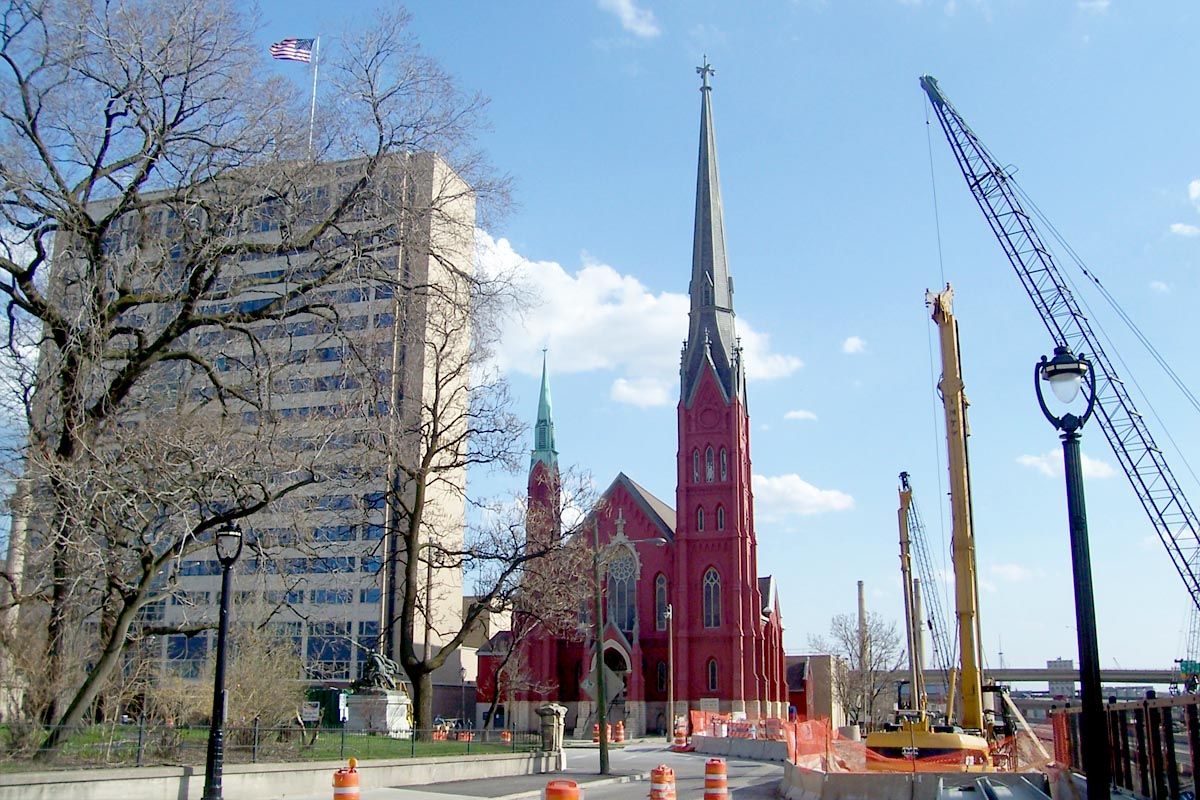
- Calvary Presbyterian Church during construction on the Marquette Interchange

- Location within Wisconsin Location within the United States
- Location: 935 West Wisconsin Avenue; Milwaukee, Wisconsin
- Coordinates: 43°2′18″N 87°55′27″W
- Built: 1870
- Architect: Koch & Hess
- Architectural style: Gothic
- MPS: West Side Area MRA
- NRHP reference No.: 86000098
- Added to NRHP: March 10, 1986

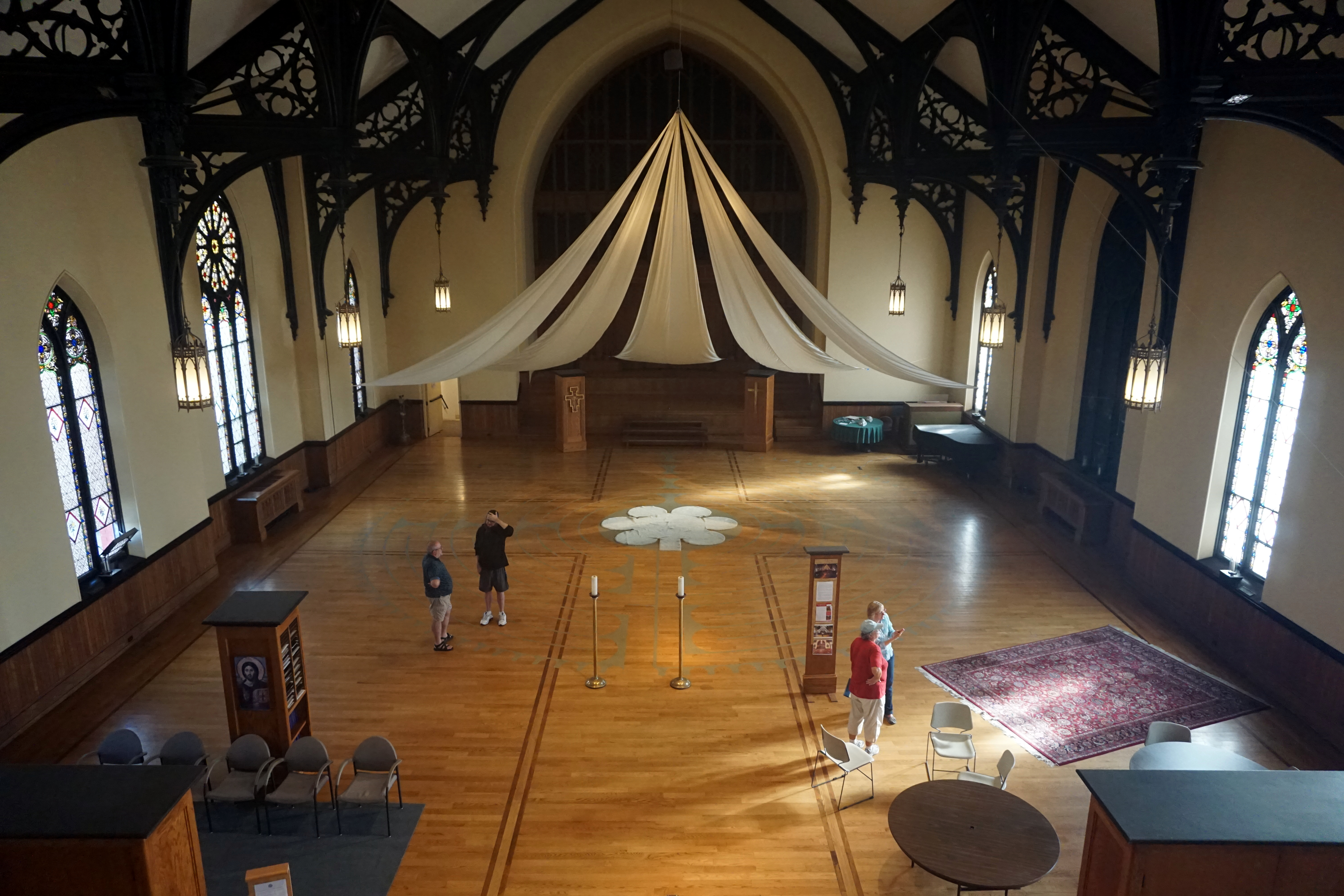
Interior of Calvary Presbyterian Church

Calvary Presbyterian Church (Calvary Church) is a Victorian Gothic church located in the Marquette University district of downtown Milwaukee, Wisconsin. It has been listed on the National Register of Historic Places since 1986.

The first Presbyterian congregation in Milwaukee was started by Reverend Cutting Marsh in 1837, and eventually became First Presbyterian. In 1849 North Presbyterian split off. In 1869, the Presbyterians on the west side wanted their own church, and some left each of the previous congregations to form Calvary. Calvary's first officers were John Plankinton, James B. Bradford, and Samuel C. West - all wealthy businessmen.

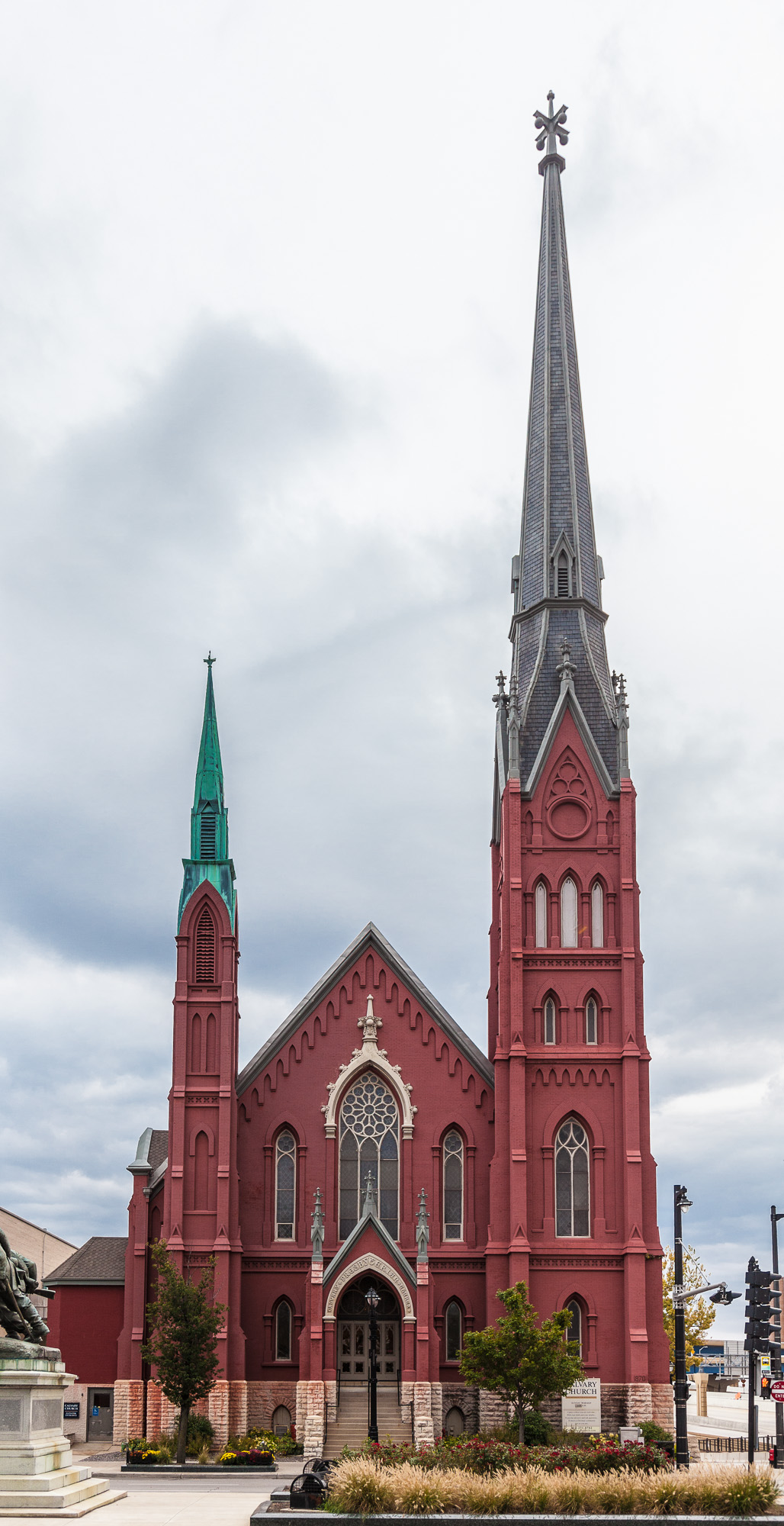
The church in 2012

They built their grand church in 1870, designed by Milwaukee architects Henry C. Koch and Julius Hess in Gothic Revival style. It sits on a foundation of ashlar limestone. The body of the structure is cream city brick, a light-colored brick kilned from local clay, with accents of Ohio sandstone. The exterior has since been painted a bright red color. The ridge of the nave is 85 feet high. On one side is a 105-foot tower with a spire clad in pressed metal. On the other side is a huge 202-foot tower with a slate-clad spire. Both towers are buttressed and topped with crosses. The main entrance stands between the towers, beneath a rose window within a larger window.

For the 1870 construction, the builder was Simeon Babcock, the mason was Hiram R. Bond, ironwork was done by Wm. Bayley and Wm. Greenslade, and John Harding painted frescoes. In 1910 a pastor's study and church office were added to the building's southwest corner. After a fire in 1947, the south end of the nave and roof were repaired. In 1957 a classroom wing was added to the southeast corner of the building.

Calvary Church features an indoor prayer labyrinth laid into the floor. Its design was inspired by a 12th-century labyrinth found at the Cathedral of Chartres in Chartres, France, and has eleven circuits with a rosette center.

The WHS survey of 1986 noted that Calvary's building is "one of the best preserved Gothic churches in the city from the period immediately following the Civil War" and "one of Milwaukee's oldest [church buildings] in continuous use."
