= David W. and Jane Curtis House =

Historic house in Wisconsin, United States

- U.S. National Register of Historic Places
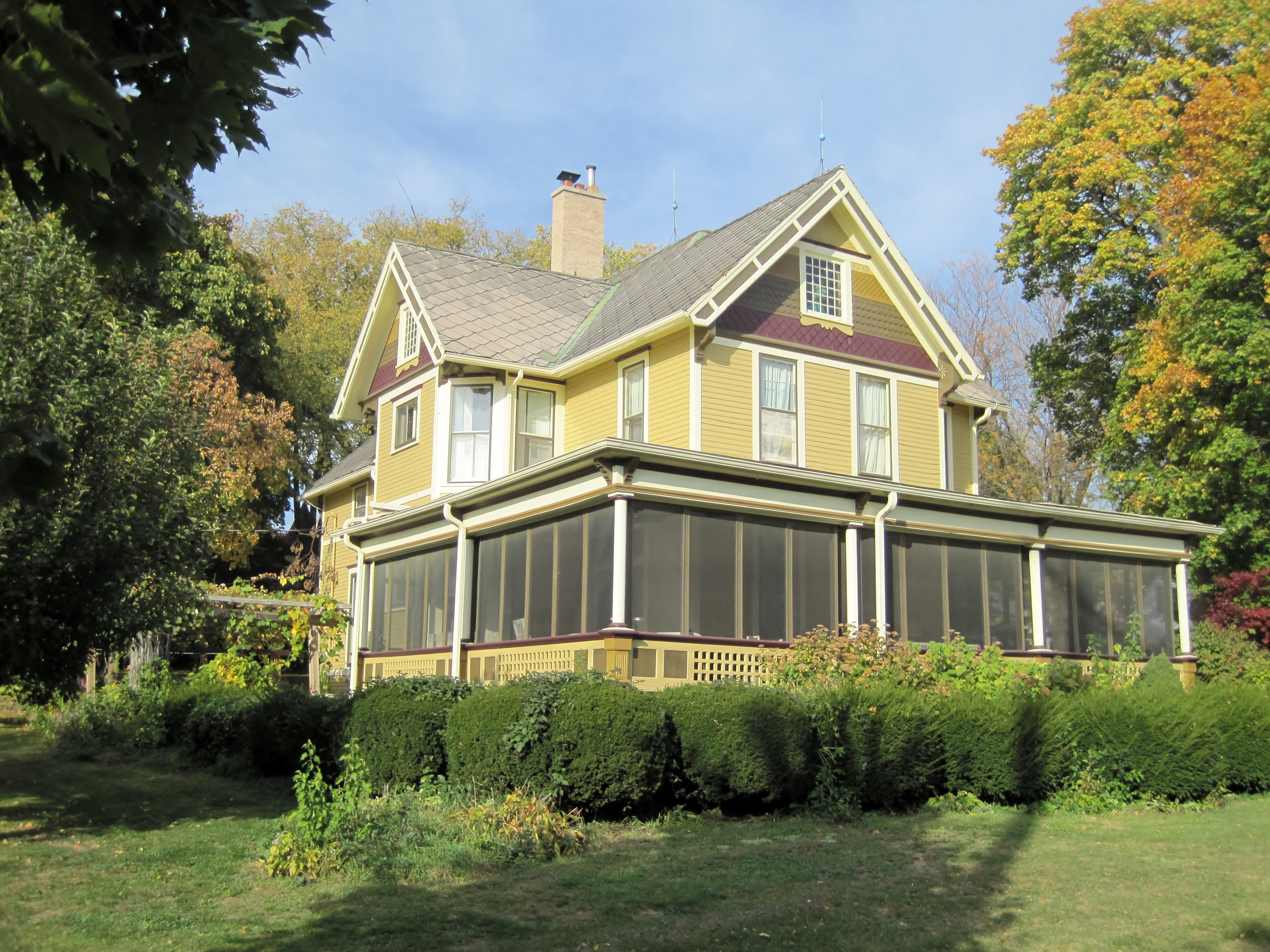

- Location within Wisconsin Location within the United States
- Location: 213 E. Sherman Ave. Fort Atkinson, Wisconsin
- Coordinates: 42°55′48″N 88°50′1″W
- Built: 1885
- Architect: Henry C. Koch
- Architectural style: Queen Anne
- NRHP reference No.: 09000309
- Added to NRHP: May 12, 2009

The David W. and Jane Curtis House is a very intact Queen Anne-styled house and matching carriage house built in 1885 in Fort Atkinson, Wisconsin, United States. It was added to the National Register of Historic Places in 2009.

David Whitney Curtis moved from Vermont to Jefferson in 1845 with his father. He helped his father farm, attended school, and apprenticed as a mason. In 1860 he married Miss Jane Howard of Hebron. In 1862 he enlisted in the Union army and served in the Civil War. After the war he and partner Oscar Cornish started a lumber and produce business. In 1868 he invented the Curtis rectangular churn and the partnership began manufacturing them in Fort Atkinson. Gradually the firm expanded to make and sell a full line of dairy and creamery supplies. In 1878 D.W. was appointed as an aid to Governor Smith. He also served important roles in the Wisconsin Dairymen's Association and the Agricultural Society.

Around 1885 David and Jane had Henry C. Koch of Milwaukee design the house pictured. The style is Queen Anne, at that time considered more progressive and comfortable than the Carpenter Gothic and Italianate styles that preceded it. Its limestone foundation supports frame walls covered with cedar siding. Typical of Queen Anne, the gable peaks are decorated with fish-scale shingles and sunburst patterns. The gable ends are framed in bargeboards. Some of the windows are multi-pane leaded glass. The current porch on the south was built around 1900, replacing the original porch which was smaller and more elaborate with one in the simpler style of late Queen Anne. Inside, the first floor has a side-hall plan, with a marble fireplace in the living room and pocket doors between some rooms. Upstairs are bedrooms and a bathroom.

The two-story carriage house was also built in 1885. It is simple and rectangular, but decorated to match the house, with multi-pane windows and fish-scale shingles in the gables framed by barge-boards. Both house and carriage house are very intact, little changed from 1885.

Curtis's patented churn was given the highest award at 1893 World's Fair in Chicago. In 1898 his company was worth $5,000,000. He lived in the house until his death in 1919.

After D.W.'s death, the house and business interests passed to his wife Jane and their son Harry. By then the company was called Creamery Package Manufacturing Company, and Harry kept it running well. After Harry died in 1938 and his wife Mary in 1945, their daughter Lucile lived in the house. After she died, it passed to her daughter Mary D. Gates in 1966. In 1971, after a legal battle, it left the family, sold to Jerry and Pat Landowski.
