= Intaglio (burial mound) =

Feature in archaeology

In North American archaeology, intaglio (Italian: [inˈtaʎʎo]) is a term from art applied to burial mounds that refers to a design cut into a hard surface. In this case, the burial mounds have designs cut into the ground, though intaglio broadly applies to burial mounds which are raised above the natural surface of the terrain. There are much more rare forms where they are left as indents below the natural terrain. These are typically in some effigy shape such as the Panther Intaglio Effigy Mound, which can be seen in Fort Atkinson, Wisconsin, where it is the last remaining intaglio mound in the state.

== See also ==
- Blythe Intaglios
- Geoglyph
- Nazca Lines (famous example)
