= Panther Intaglio Effigy Mound =

- U.S. National Register of Historic Places
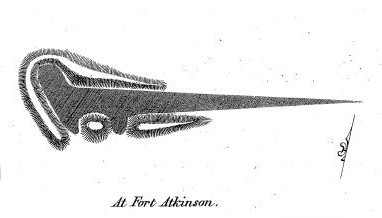
- Lapham's sketch of the mound from 1850

- Location within Wisconsin Location within the United States
- Interactive map of Panther Intaglio Effigy Mound
- Location: 1236 Riverside Dr. Fort Atkinson, Wisconsin
- Coordinates: 42.9252°N 88.8545°W
- NRHP reference No.: 70000035
- Added to NRHP: October 15, 1970

The Panther Intaglio Effigy Mound is a ground depression in Fort Atkinson, Wisconsin. The effigy is a reverse mound: a depression in the shape of a panther or water spirit created by Native Americans before the arrival of settlers. In the mid-1800s ten of these reverse effigy mounds were found in Wisconsin, but all except this one have been destroyed. It was added to the National Register of Historic Places in 1970.

The vast majority of effigy mounds are mounds, where people piled soil a few feet above the natural surface of the ground to form the shape of some animal or geometric object. In contrast, an intaglio "mound" is a hole dug in the shape of the object.

The Panther Intaglio in Fort Atkinson is a cavity 125 feet long and two feet deep on the north side of the Rock River. The shape of the hole has been described as a lizard, a panther, and a water spirit. Whatever was intended, the shape is commonly found among the raised mounds of the upper Midwest. The hole at Fort Atkinson is also known to be man-made because it once lay in a group of over a dozen raised mounds, including some conical mounds, a bird, a bear, a dumb-bell shape, and some linear mounds. All these others are now gone, lost to farms and homebuilding, leaving only the panther intaglio in a small city park.

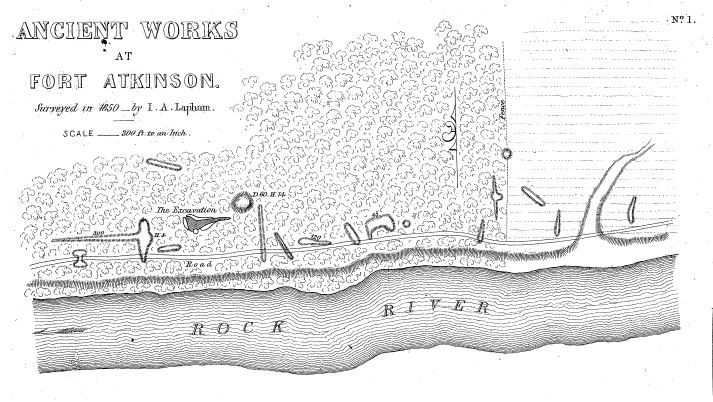
Lapham's map of the mounds around the Panther Intaglio as they stood in 1850. The Panther Intaglio is the one labeled "The Excavation."

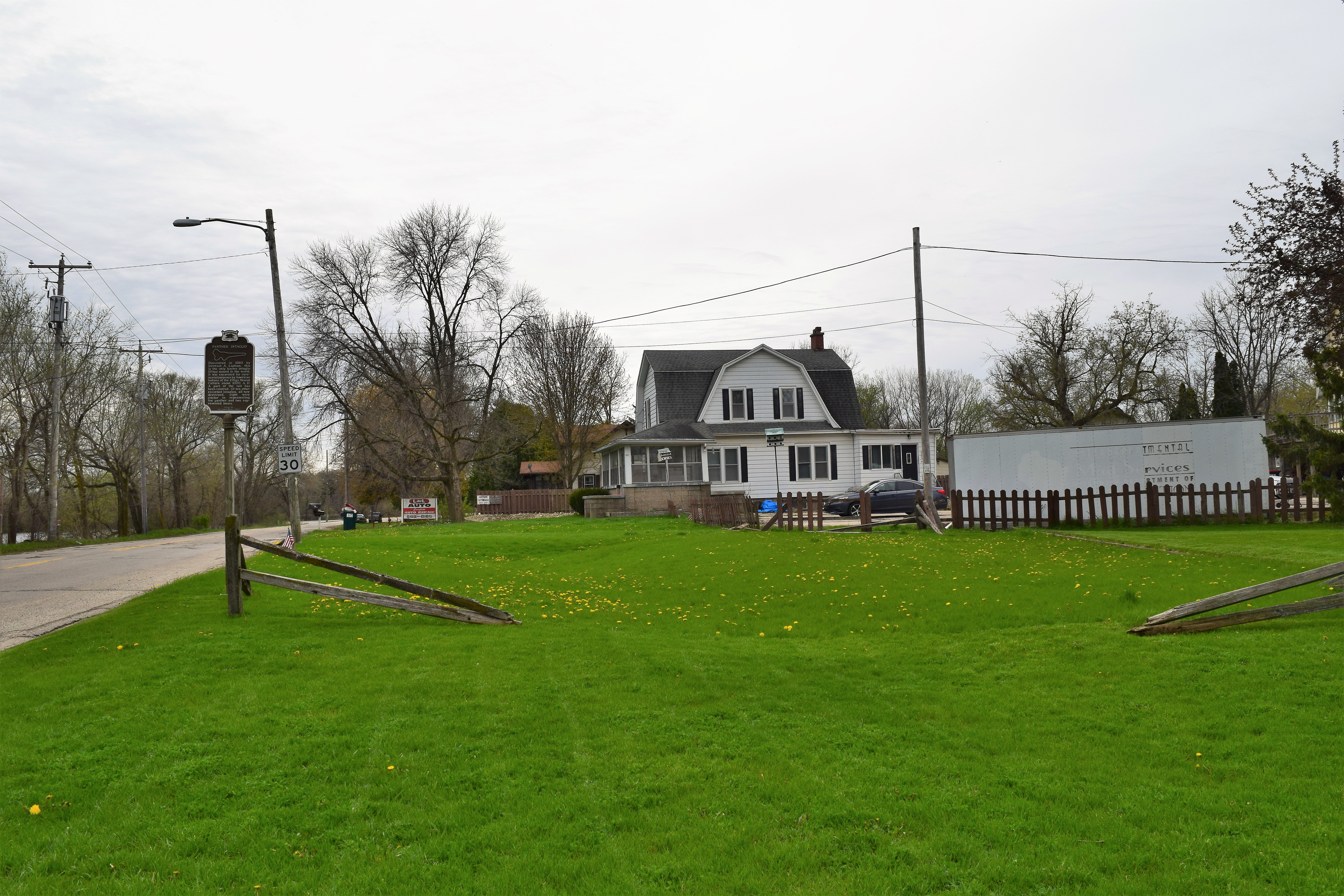
The mound in 2020

Effigy mounds were built in Wisconsin from 700 to 1200 A.D., so the panther effigy was dug in that interval. The site was discovered in 1850 by Increase A. Lapham. Of the hundreds of effigy mounds he surveyed in southern Wisconsin, only eight others were intaglios:

- a 145-foot "lizard" near Forest Home Cemetery in Milwaukee
- four "lizard" intaglios six miles north of Milwaukee, with the longest 290 feet
- a 133-foot "lizard" 1.5 miles southeast of Pewaukee
- two smaller geometric intaglios at Theresa

Lapham termed the shape a "lizard" as a convenience, acknowledging that he didn't know what it was intended to represent. Later archaeologists called them panthers and water spirits. Some speculate that water spirits constituted many of the intaglio mounds because water spirits are associated with the lowerworld, more like a depression in the ground than a mound above.

Lapham's detailed sketch shows ridges around the head and body of the animal – probably soil removed from the hole. Antiquarian Stephen Peet felt that the tail of the lizard/panther led up to the large conical mound nearby, and he asserted that an intaglio was always connected with a conical mound, with the conical mound used as a lookout and the depression a hiding place for hunters.

Only two other intaglio mounds have been found in Wisconsin, two bear-shaped intaglios found near Baraboo in the mid-1800s. By 1893 all the intaglios except the one at Fort Atkinson had been destroyed. By 1910 that last remaining intaglio was in some danger, so the Daughters of the American Revolution, working with ex-governor Hoard and others, managed to buy it and preserve it in a small park.
