= Increase A. Lapham =

American scientist (1811–1875)

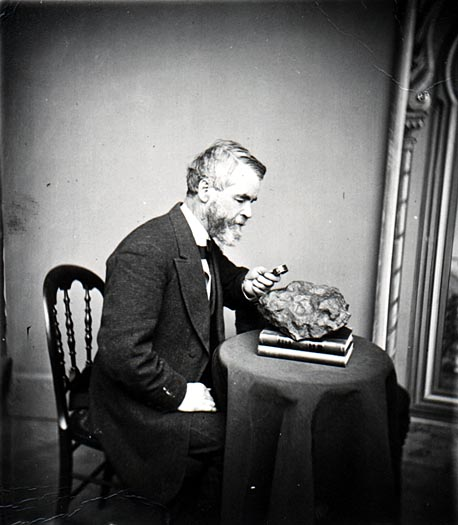
- Lapham examining a meteorite which had fallen in Wisconsin in 1868
- Born: March 7, 1811; Palmyra, New York, US
- Died: September 14, 1875 (aged 64); Oconomowoc, Wisconsin, US
- Known for: Natural history in Wisconsin
- Scientific career
- Fields: Ecology, natural history, biology, geography
- Author abbrev. (botany): Lapham

Increase Allen Lapham (March 7, 1811 – September 14, 1875) was an American writer, scientist, and naturalist, whose work focused primarily on the what is now the U.S. state of Wisconsin. He made maps of the area and published numerous books on the archaeology, biology, and geology of the region, and discovered both the Panther Intaglio Effigy Mound and Milwaukee Formation. He founded the Wisconsin Natural History Association, and served as the state's Chief Geologist for two years. He also lobbied Congress and the Smithsonian Institution to establish an agency to predict the weather around the Great Lakes, and these efforts led to what is today the National Weather Service.

== Biography ==
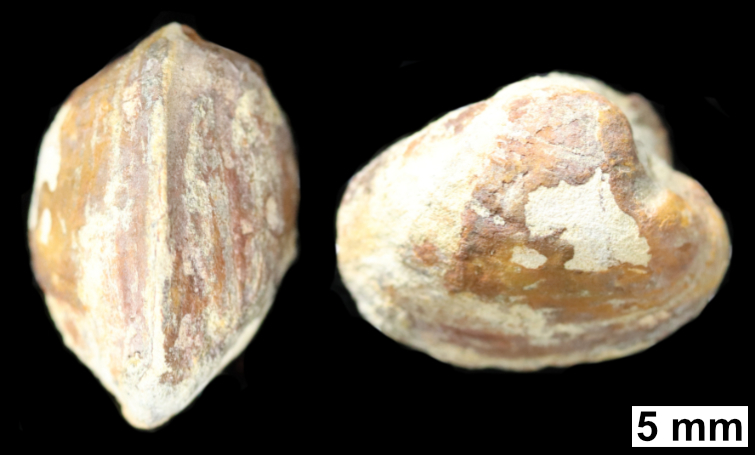
The bivalve Nuculites laphami (Cleland, 1911) from the Milwaukee Formation, Middle Devonian, Wisconsin

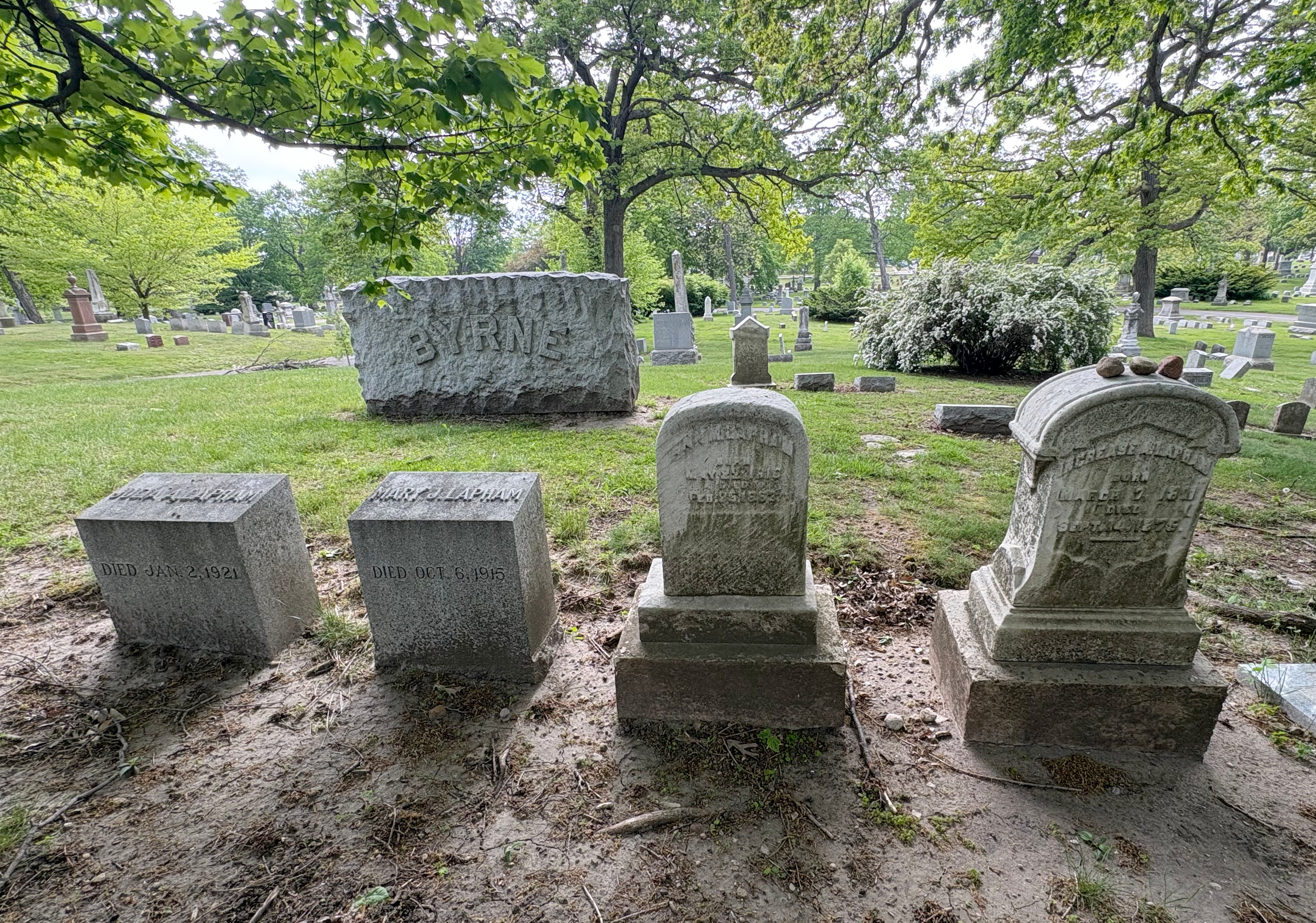
Lapham's grave (rightmost) at Forest Home Cemetery

Born in Palmyra, New York, his family moved to Pennsylvania, back to New York, to Ohio then to Louisville, Kentucky (1827–1830) then back to Ohio while his father, Seneca Lapham, worked on the canals in various locations. Lapham was of entirely English ancestry, all of which had been in what is now the United States since the early 1600s. His ancestors were among the first English colonists to establish Rhode Island. He displayed a talent for scientific observation early on while working on the canals and their locks, producing drawings that he could sell at the age of thirteen.

In July 1836, Lapham moved to Kilbourntown (which soon incorporated into the city of Milwaukee, Wisconsin) and worked closely with Byron Kilbourn in his business and development endeavors. The two had worked together previously on the Miami Canal and Lapham considered him a loyal friend and mentor. Before the end of the year, Lapham had published a Catalogue of Plants and Shells, Found in the vicinity of Milwaukee, on the West Side of Lake Michigan, perhaps the first scientific work published west of the Great Lakes.

In 1848, Lapham founded the Wisconsin Natural History Association, a predecessor of the Wisconsin Academy of Sciences, Arts, and Letters, of which he also was a charter member.

Many of his works and early maps were used for various civil projects such as canal and railroad development. In 1844 Lapham published the first substantial book on the geography of the Wisconsin Territory. His first map of Wisconsin was made in 1846. He published many more papers and books through his life, particularly on geology, archaeology and history, and flora and fauna of Wisconsin, including publication by the Smithsonian Institution.

In 1850, he discovered the Panther Intaglio Effigy Mound, which is now listed on the National Register of Historic Places.

Lapham was elected a member of the American Antiquarian Society in 1853, and he was Chief Geologist of the State of Wisconsin from 1873 to 1875. He was elected as a member to the American Philosophical Society in 1874.

He died in Oconomowoc on September 14, 1875, and was buried at Forest Home Cemetery in Milwaukee.

Lapham was one of the first people to recognize the cement potential of certain rock strata seen along the banks of the Milwaukee River. Those strata, now known as belonging to the Milwaukee Formation, were later mined for high quality natural hydraulic cement. Milwaukee thus went on to become the country's leading producer of natural hydraulic cement from 1876 to 1910.

== Honors ==
Lapham is considered "Wisconsin's first great scientist" and the "Father of the U.S Weather Service," based upon his lobbying to Congress and the Smithsonian Institution to create such an agency to forecast storms on the Great Lakes and both coasts. When the agency was created through the U.S. Secretary of War, Lapham made the first such accurate Great Lakes storm warning from Chicago.

Since his death, numerous landmarks throughout the southeastern Wisconsin area have been named after him, including Lapham Peak, the highest point in Waukesha County, Wisconsin, a major University of Wisconsin–Milwaukee building, and streets. In Madison, Wisconsin, he currently has an elementary school named after him.

A genus of North American plants, Laphamia, was named for him by Asa Gray. Several species of invertebrates from the Paleozoic rocks of Wisconsin, such as Nuculites laphami (Cleland, 1911) and Ekwanoscutellum laphami (Whitfield, 1877), were also named in honor of him. Certain markings found on iron meteors were designated by J. Lawrence Smith as Laphamite markings. A formerly existing glacial lake was provisionally named Lake Lapham. The Wisconsin Archeological Society awards the Lapham Research Medal, first doing so in 1926. The U.S. Navy named a ship SS Increase A. Lapham during World War II. The University of Wisconsin has an Increase A. Lapham Professorship. Lapham was inducted in 1992 into the Wisconsin Conservation Hall of Fame and in 2003 into the Wisconsin Forestry Hall of Fame.

The centennial of Lapham's birth was celebrated in 1911. In 2011, celebration of the bicentennial was planned, including an Increase A. Lapham Day at Aztalan State Park.

Lapham Junction (44°17′51″N 90°28′41″W) in Knapp, Jackson County, Wisconsin, is now defunct railroad junction on the Goodyear branch of the Milwaukee Road which branch ran to Zeda, where lumbering operations took place, and was named for Lapham.

== Selected works ==
Some works of Increase A. Lapham:

Title	Date
Notice of the Louisville and Shipping sport Canal and of the Geology of the vicinity	1828
A Catalogue of Plants & Shells, Found in the Vicinity of Milwaukee, on the West Side of Lake Michigan	1836
A Geographical and Topographical Description of Wisconsin	1844
Wisconsin: its geography and topography, history, geology, and mineralogy	1846
Fauna and Flora of Wisconsin	1852
The Antiquities of Wisconsin	1855
On the Man-shaped Mounds of Wisconsin	1859
Opening an Ancient Mound Near Madison, Wisconsin	1860
Geological Map of Wisconsin	1855
Report on the Disastrous Effects of the Destruction of Forest Trees	1867
New Geological Map of Wisconsin	1869
Oconomowoc and other Small Lakes of Wisconsin	1876

== See also ==
- Carte de visite
- Fox–Wisconsin Waterway
- Lapham Memorial
- Soldiers' Home Reef
