= Fort Atkinson, Wisconsin =

- City
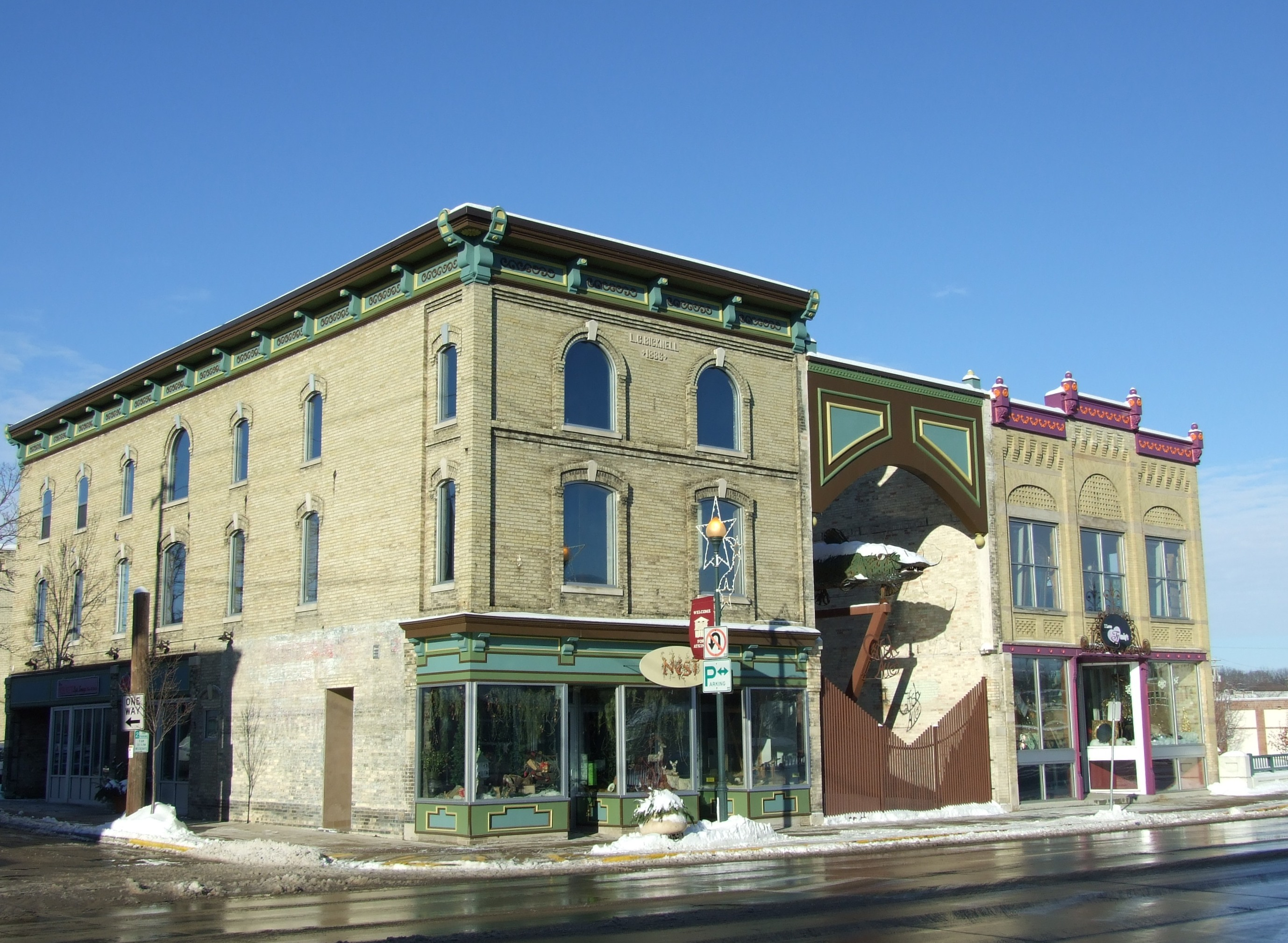
- Downtown Fort Atkinson in December 2007

- Location of Fort Atkinson in Jefferson County, Wisconsin

- Location within Wisconsin Location within the United States
- Coordinates: 42°55′38″N 88°50′26″W
- Country: United States
- State: Wisconsin
- County: Jefferson

Government
  - Type: City Council
  - President: Mason Becker

Area
  - Total: 5.80 sq mi (15.03 km^{2})
  - Land: 5.66 sq mi (14.66 km^{2})
  - Water: 0.14 sq mi (0.37 km^{2})
- Elevation: 787 ft (240 m)

Population (2020)
  - Total: 12,579
  - Density: 2,223/sq mi (858.2/km^{2})
- Time zone: UTC-6 (CST)
  - Summer (DST): UTC-5 (CDT)
- Zip Code: 53538
- Area code: 920
- FIPS code: 55-26675
- GNIS feature ID: 1565151
- Website: www.fortatkinsonwi.gov

Fort Atkinson is a city in Jefferson County, Wisconsin, United States. It lies along the Rock River a few miles upstream from Lake Koshkonong. The population was 12,579 at the 2020 census. Fort Atkinson is the largest city located entirely in Jefferson County, as Watertown is split between Jefferson and Dodge counties. Fort Atkinson is a principal city of the Watertown–Fort Atkinson micropolitan statistical area, which is, in turn, a sub-market of the larger Milwaukee–Waukesha–Racine combined statistical area.

== History ==
Fort Atkinson was named after General Henry Atkinson, the commander of U.S. forces in the area during the Black Hawk War (1832) against a mixed band of Sauk, Meskwaki and Kickapoo peoples. The city developed at the site of Fort Koshkonong, which was used during that war. A replica of the original 1832 stockade has been built just outside town, although not at the original site. The fort was located to control the confluence of the Rock and Bark rivers.

The settlement grew rapidly in the mid-19th century, after the migration of pioneers from the east, especially New York State and the northern tier. They were among the many migrants carrying New England Yankee culture west across the northern tier of states.

The history and natural history of Fort Atkinson and the surrounding area are presented at the Hoard Historical Museum and National Dairy Shrine Museum. William Dempster Hoard founded the nationally distributed dairy farm magazine Hoard's Dairyman in Fort Atkinson in 1885. The museums include the Frank and Luella Hoard House, the Dwight and Almira Foster House, and the Knox Research Library and Archive. The Dairy Shrine portion of the complex portrays the past, present, and future of the dairy industry.

The oldest manmade features near Fort Atkinson are a cluster of prehistoric earthworks indigenous mounds just south of town. Early European settlers named them the General Atkinson Mound Group. The mounds are a remnant of the Woodland Period in present-day Wisconsin. They are effigy and geometric mounds, different from the platform mounds at nearby Aztalan State Park, built by peoples of the Mississippian culture, which reached its peak around 1300. They had settlements throughout the Mississippi Valley and its tributaries, extending from central Illinois northward to the Great Lakes and also to the Southeastern United States. Materials were traded within the culture from the Great Lakes to the Gulf of Mexico. A 125-foot (38 m) long panther intaglio, the Panther Intaglio Effigy Mound, appears on a mound west of town, the last remaining intaglio in the state.

Fort Atkinson's 19th- and early 20th-century building history is preserved in the Main Street and Merchants Avenue historic districts. Other Registered Historic Places include the Fort Atkinson Water Tower, David W. and Jane Curtis House, Hoard's Dairyman Farm, and Jones Dairy Farm.

== Geography and climate ==
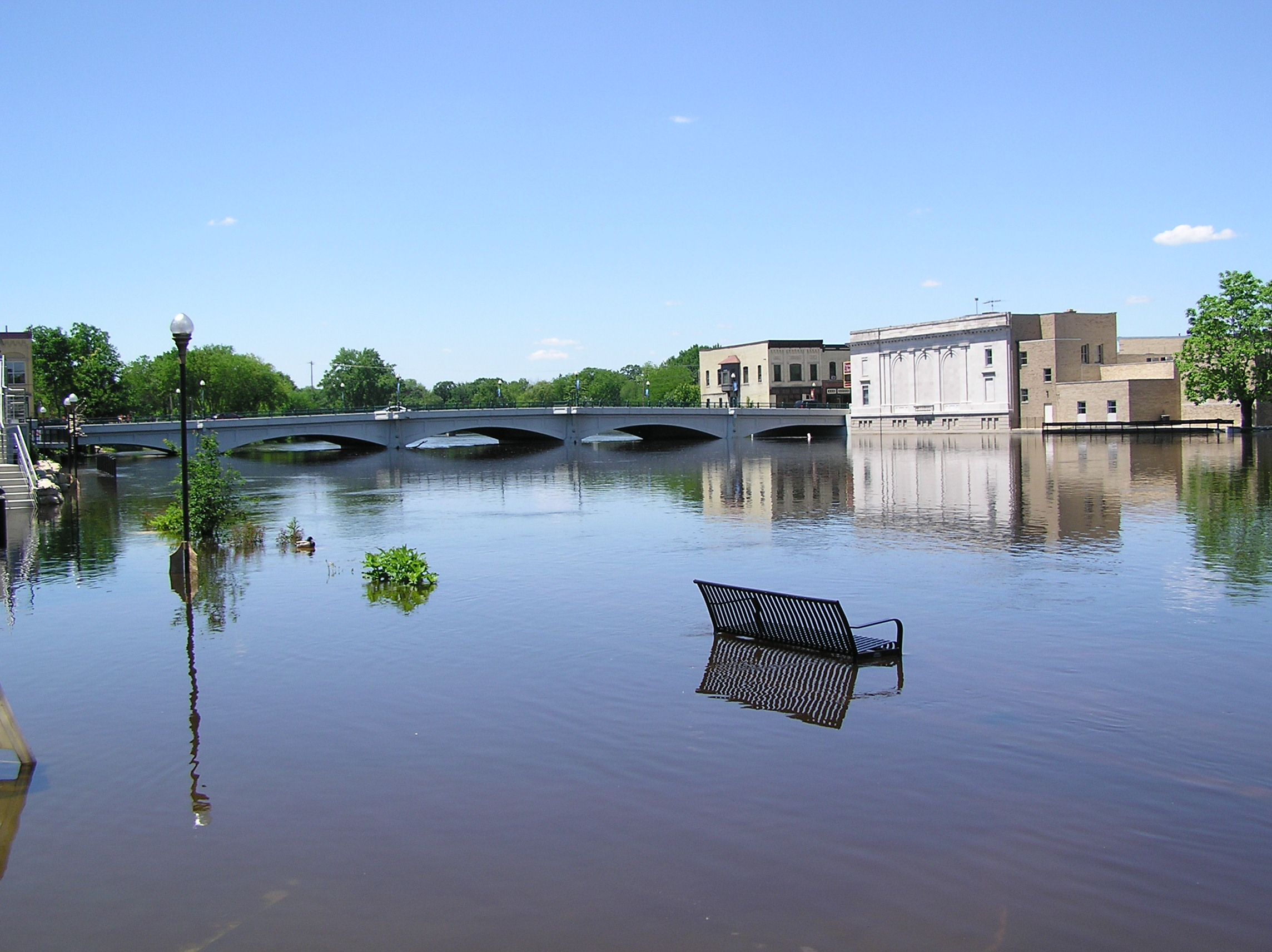
Rock River flooding downtown area, 2004

Fort Atkinson is located at 42°55′38″N 88°50′26″W (42.927091, −88.840446).

According to the United States Census Bureau, the city has a total area of 5.80 square miles (15.02 km^{2}), of which 5.66 square miles (14.66 km^{2}) is land and 0.14 square miles (0.36 km^{2}) is water.

The city developed along the river, which provided the earliest transportation pathways for trade and travel. Occasionally, the downtown area is flooded when the Rock River exceeds its banks. Just east of the city, the Bark River enters the Rock River and can add considerable volume in certain seasons. The Rock River is a tributary of the Mississippi River, which it joins at Rock Island, Illinois.

Climate data for Fort Atkinson Wastewater Treatment Plant, Wisconsin (1991–2020 normals, extremes 1941–present)
Month	Jan	Feb	Mar	Apr	May	Jun	Jul	Aug	Sep	Oct	Nov	Dec	Year
Record high °F (°C)	58 (14)	72 (22)	84 (29)	90 (32)	96 (36)	101 (38)	103 (39)	102 (39)	98 (37)	88 (31)	78 (26)	67 (19)	103 (39)
Mean maximum °F (°C)	45.6 (7.6)	50.3 (10.2)	65.0 (18.3)	77.1 (25.1)	85.1 (29.5)	90.4 (32.4)	91.1 (32.8)	89.2 (31.8)	86.9 (30.5)	79.1 (26.2)	63.9 (17.7)	50.2 (10.1)	93.2 (34.0)
Mean daily maximum °F (°C)	27.7 (−2.4)	31.6 (−0.2)	43.6 (6.4)	56.9 (13.8)	69.1 (20.6)	79.0 (26.1)	82.5 (28.1)	80.6 (27.0)	74.0 (23.3)	60.9 (16.1)	45.7 (7.6)	33.2 (0.7)	57.1 (13.9)
Daily mean °F (°C)	19.2 (−7.1)	22.7 (−5.2)	34.1 (1.2)	46.6 (8.1)	58.3 (14.6)	68.3 (20.2)	72.1 (22.3)	70.1 (21.2)	62.6 (17.0)	50.3 (10.2)	37.2 (2.9)	25.5 (−3.6)	47.2 (8.4)
Mean daily minimum °F (°C)	10.7 (−11.8)	13.8 (−10.1)	24.7 (−4.1)	36.2 (2.3)	47.5 (8.6)	57.7 (14.3)	61.7 (16.5)	59.6 (15.3)	51.2 (10.7)	39.7 (4.3)	28.6 (−1.9)	17.9 (−7.8)	37.4 (3.0)
Mean minimum °F (°C)	−11.6 (−24.2)	−7.2 (−21.8)	4.1 (−15.5)	22.8 (−5.1)	33.5 (0.8)	44.3 (6.8)	51.0 (10.6)	49.7 (9.8)	36.9 (2.7)	26.1 (−3.3)	13.0 (−10.6)	−2.7 (−19.3)	−15.8 (−26.6)
Record low °F (°C)	−33 (−36)	−39 (−39)	−21 (−29)	−4 (−20)	25 (−4)	33 (1)	39 (4)	37 (3)	28 (−2)	11 (−12)	−14 (−26)	−29 (−34)	−39 (−39)
Average precipitation inches (mm)	1.51 (38)	1.43 (36)	1.96 (50)	3.56 (90)	4.13 (105)	4.98 (126)	4.03 (102)	3.86 (98)	3.33 (85)	2.84 (72)	2.20 (56)	1.71 (43)	35.54 (903)
Average snowfall inches (cm)	10.7 (27)	9.4 (24)	4.0 (10)	1.2 (3.0)	0.2 (0.51)	0.0 (0.0)	0.0 (0.0)	0.0 (0.0)	0.0 (0.0)	0.1 (0.25)	2.1 (5.3)	8.7 (22)	36.4 (92)
Average precipitation days (≥ 0.01 in)	9.3	8.4	9.1	12.1	12.9	11.5	9.5	9.4	9.2	10.0	8.8	9.6	119.8
Average snowy days (≥ 0.1 in)	7.3	5.9	3.3	0.8	0.0	0.0	0.0	0.0	0.0	0.1	1.6	6.0	25.0
Source: NOAA

== Demographics ==
Historical population
Census	Pop.	Note	%±
1850	334		—
1870	2,010		—
1880	1,969		−2.0%
1890	2,283		15.9%
1900	3,043		33.3%
1910	3,877		27.4%
1920	4,915		26.8%
1930	5,793		17.9%
1940	6,153		6.2%
1950	6,280		2.1%
1960	7,908		25.9%
1970	9,164		15.9%
1980	9,785		6.8%
1990	10,227		4.5%
2000	11,621		13.6%
2010	12,368		6.4%
2020	12,579		1.7%
U.S. Decennial Census

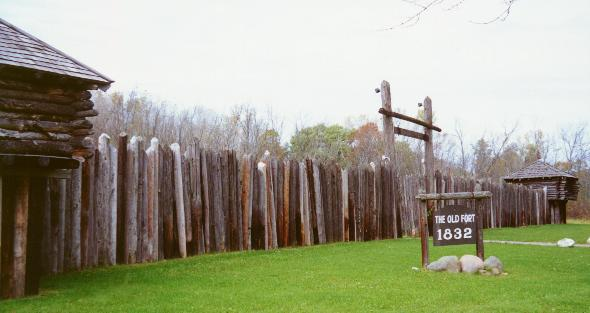
Replica of early 19th-century army fortification built in Fort Atkinson

=== 2020 census ===
As of the 2020 census, Fort Atkinson had a population of 12,579. The population density was 2,222.4 inhabitants per square mile (858.1/km^{2}). The median age was 40.7 years. 22.4% of residents were under the age of 18 and 18.8% of residents were 65 years of age or older. For every 100 females there were 93.5 males, and for every 100 females age 18 and over there were 89.3 males age 18 and over.

100.0% of residents lived in urban areas, while 0.0% lived in rural areas.

There were 5,345 households in Fort Atkinson, of which 28.2% had children under the age of 18 living in them. Of all households, 42.2% were married-couple households, 19.6% were households with a male householder and no spouse or partner present, and 29.4% were households with a female householder and no spouse or partner present. About 33.1% of all households were made up of individuals and 14.5% had someone living alone who was 65 years of age or older.

There were 5,590 housing units at an average density of 987.6 per square mile (381.3/km^{2}), of which 4.4% were vacant. The homeowner vacancy rate was 1.1% and the rental vacancy rate was 3.8%.

Racial composition as of the 2020 census
Race	Number	Percent
White	10,801	85.9%
Black or African American	129	1.0%
American Indian and Alaska Native	54	0.4%
Asian	118	0.9%
Native Hawaiian and Other Pacific Islander	2	0.0%
Some other race	593	4.7%
Two or more races	882	7.0%
Hispanic or Latino (of any race)	1,330	10.6%

=== 2010 census ===
As of the census of 2010, there were 12,368 people, 5,125 households, and 3,214 families residing in the city. The population density was 2,181.3 inhabitants per square mile (842.2/km^{2}). There were 5,429 housing units at an average density of 957.5 per square mile (369.7/km^{2}). The racial makeup of the city was 92.5% White, 0.6% African American, 0.3% Native American, 0.7% Asian, 4.4% from other races, and 1.4% from two or more races. Hispanic or Latino people of any race were 9.1% of the population.

There were 5,125 households, of which 31.4% had children under the age of 18 living with them, 47.1% were married couples living together, 10.7% had a female householder with no husband present, 4.9% had a male householder with no wife present, and 37.3% were non-families. 30.2% of all households were made up of individuals, and 12.3% had someone living alone who was 65 years of age or older. The average household size was 2.36 and the average family size was 2.94.

The median age in the city was 38.4 years. 23.9% of residents were under the age of 18; 7.5% were between the ages of 18 and 24; 27.4% were from 25 to 44; 26.6% were from 45 to 64; and 14.6% were 65 years of age or older. The gender makeup of the city was 48.5% male and 51.5% female.

=== 2000 census ===
As of the census of 2000, there were 11,621 people, 4,760 households, and 3,070 families residing in the city. The population density was 2,154.8 people per square mile (832.4/km^{2}). There were 4,983 housing units at an average density of 924.0 per square mile (356.9/km^{2}). The racial makeup of the city was 93.09% White, 0.34% African American, 0.29% Native American, 0.60% Asian, 0.01% Pacific Islander, 1.87% from other races, and 0.79% from two or more races. Hispanic or Latino people of any race were 4.37% of the population.

There were 4,760 households, out of which 31.4% had children under the age of 18 living with them, 52.2% were married couples living together, 9.2% had a female householder with no husband present, and 35.5% were non-families. 29.4% of all households were made up of individuals, and 12.7% had someone living alone who was 65 years of age or older. The average household size was 2.40 and the average family size was 2.96.

In the city, the population was spread out, with 24.2% under the age of 18, 8.6% from 18 to 24, 30.9% from 25 to 44, 21.8% from 45 to 64, and 14.5% who were 65 years of age or older. The median age was 36 years. For every 100 females, there were 93.4 males. For every 100 females age 18 and over, there were 90.6 males.

The median income for a household in the city was $43,807, and the median income for a family was $51,689. Males had a median income of $36,442 versus $23,852 for females. The per capita income for the city was $21,008. 5.3% of the population and 3.9% of families were below the poverty line. Out of the total population, 4.7% of those under the age of 18 and 5.8% of those 65 and older were living below the poverty line.

== Economy ==
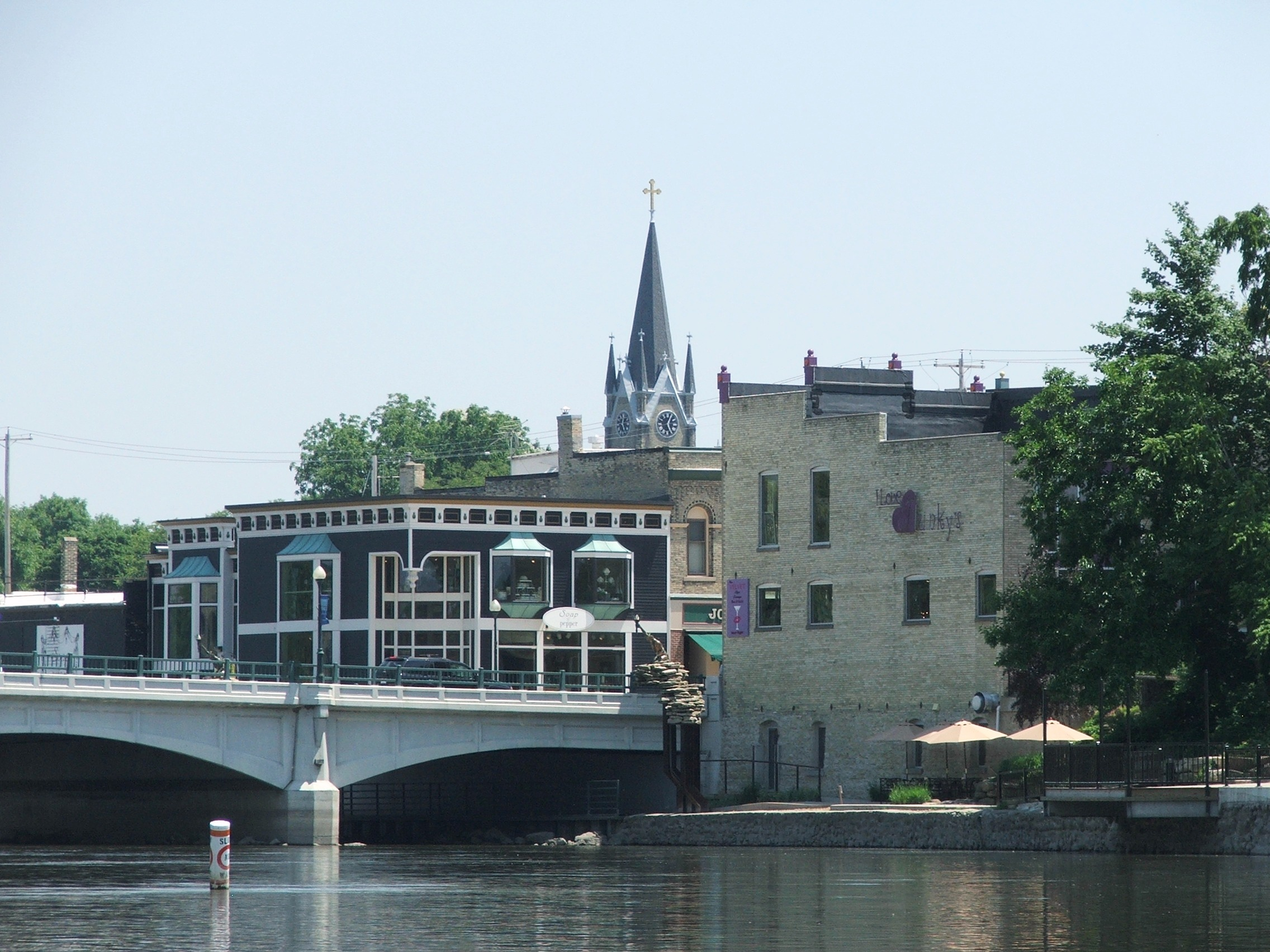
Downtown Fort Atkinson

The city's largest employer is Fort HealthCare, an integrated hospital and health system. Fort Atkinson Memorial Hospital has 82 licensed beds and more than 100 physicians on staff. Fort Medical Group, a subsidiary of Fort HealthCare, employs more than 60 physicians, nurse practitioners, and other healthcare providers. The city is also home to Cygnus Business Media, NASCO, Spacesaver and Jones Dairy Farm.

Fireside Dinner Theatre draws thousands of visitors each year. Another tourist attraction is a reconstruction of the original fort.

== Media ==
Fort Atkinson is home to a daily newspaper, the Daily Jefferson County Union, as well as two radio stations, WFAW and WSJY. Fort Atkinson shares a radio market with the Janesville-Beloit area and is also served by stations from Milwaukee and Madison. A small student newspaper and website called "the Signal" is also run in the Fort Atkinson High School, which focuses on local events that affect students in the district. Fort Atkinson is a part of the Milwaukee television market with stations from Madison also available over the air and on cable.

== Healthcare ==
Fort Memorial Hospital is a 49 bed hospital located in Fort Atkinson. There are 45.6 primary care physicians per 100,000 population in the area. Fort Atkinson is designated as both a mental health and primary care Health Professional Shortage Area (HPSA) qualifying the area as a medical desert. By 2035, Fort Atkinson is expected to have a 50.3% deficit in primary care physicians, the seventh largest expected deficit in Wisconsin. There are two behavioral health professionals in Fort Atkinson.

== Education ==
Fort Atkinson School District has four elementary schools, a middle school and a high school. Barrie, Rockwell, Purdy, and Luther elementary schools serve grades kindergarten to 5, Fort Atkinson Middle School (FAMS) grades 6 to 8, and Fort Atkinson High School grades 9 to 12. The high school's mascot is the Blackhawk, named after the Sauk leader Chief Blackhawk.

Crown of Life Christian Academy (2K–8) and St. Paul's Lutheran School (3K–8) are Christian schools of the Wisconsin Evangelical Lutheran Synod (WELS) in Fort Atkinson.

Saint Joseph's school is a private catholic school that teaches kindergarten through 8th grade. It is located in the southwest portion of the town on the corner of Hackbarth Road and Endl Boulevard. The school is located in the Roman Catholic Diocese of Madison.

The Dwight Foster Public Library, established in 1892, serves as Jefferson County's resource library. It serves residents of Fort Atkinson and its surrounding communities.

== Transportation ==
Primary automobile transportation is provided via Highway 12, Highway 26, Highway 89 and Highway 106. Highway 26 provides easy access to Interstate 94 (to the north in Johnson Creek), leading to downtown Milwaukee in about an hour; and to Interstate 90 (to the south in Janesville) leading to downtown Chicago in about 2.5 hours. Highway 12 provides access to the Madison metro area in about 45 minutes. Fort Atkinson was a stop on the C&NW Milwaukee to Madison line. There is no public transportation available within city limits.

=== Airport ===
Fort Atkinson is served by the Fort Atkinson Municipal Airport (FAA LID: 61C).

== Notable people ==
- Helmut Ajango, architect
- Kyle Borland, former professional football player
- Neal Brown, lawyer, businessman, politician, and writer
- Lucien B. Caswell, served in the Wisconsin State Assembly and as a draft commissioner during the American Civil War
- David Whitney Curtis, businessman, American Civil War veteran, and Republican politician; built the David W. and Jane Curtis House in Fort Atkinson, which is on the National Register of Historic Places
- Palmer F. Daugs, Wisconsin State Representative
- Wallace Dollase, Thoroughbred racehorse trainer of two national Champions
- Gerald L. Endl, Medal of Honor recipient
- Charlie Grimm, major league baseball player and manager
- Charles Hammarquist, state legislator; first immigrant from Sweden to be elected as a legislator from a Western state
- William D. Hoard, Governor of Wisconsin 1889–1891, founder of Daily Jefferson County Union and Hoard's Dairyman
- Joel Hodgson, host and creator of Mystery Science Theater 3000
- David Keene political consultant & former chairman of the American Conservative Union
- Rosemary Kennedy, sister of John F. Kennedy, died in Fort Atkinson in 2005
- Randall S. Knox, Wisconsin State Representative
- George Marston, San Diego community leader and department store owner
- Archie McComb, Wisconsin State Representative
- Guy Moon, composer
- Keith Neubert, former professional football player
- Lorine Niedecker, only woman associated with the Objectivist poets
- John Offerdahl, former professional football player
- Craig Rice, author, mystery writer
- Jeff Sauer, ice hockey player and coach
- Josh Sawyer, video game designer
- Mark Seidl, Wisconsin Court of Appeals judge
- Robert J. Shelby, U.S. District Court judge – author of precedent-making decision on gay marriage
- Charles A. Snover, Wisconsin State Senator
- Howard Weiss, 1938 Big Ten football MVP
- Horace B. Willard, Wisconsin State Representative, physician, and businessman
- Whitey Woodin, former professional football player
- Nick Zentner, professor at Central Washington University and science communicator

== See also ==
- Panther Intaglio Effigy Mound
- Hoard's Dairyman
- Dwight Foster Public Library
