= Machine tool =

Machine for handling or machining metal or other rigid materials

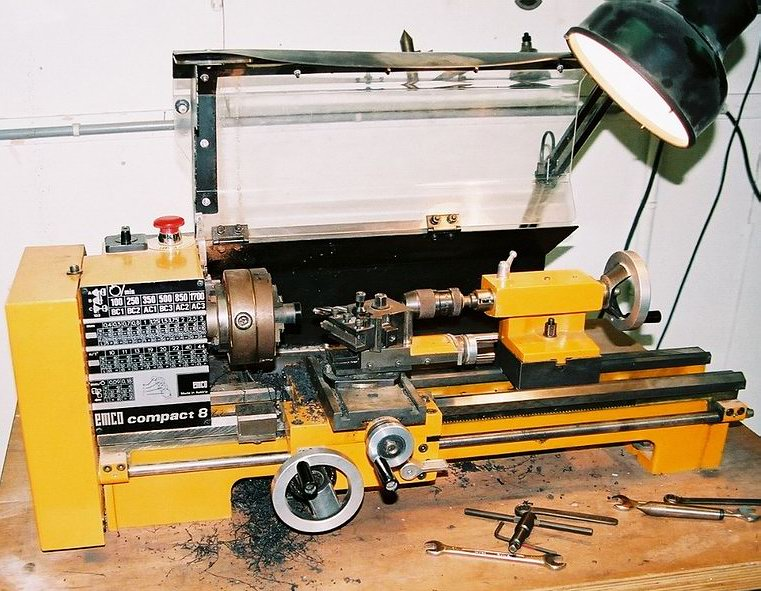
A metal lathe is an example of a machine tool.

A machine tool is a machine for handling or machining metal or other rigid materials, usually by cutting, boring, grinding, shearing, or other forms of deformations. Machine tools employ some sort of tool that does the cutting or shaping. All machine tools have some means of constraining the workpiece and provide a guided movement of the parts of the machine. Thus, the relative movement between the workpiece and the cutting tool (which is called the toolpath) is controlled or constrained by the machine to at least some extent, rather than being entirely "offhand" or "freehand". It is a power-driven metal cutting machine which assists in managing the needed relative motion between cutting tool and the job that changes the size and shape of the job material.

The precise definition of the term machine tool varies among users. While all machine tools are "machines that help people to make things", not all factory machines are machine tools.

Today machine tools are typically powered other than by the human muscle (e.g., electrically, hydraulically, or via line shaft), used to make manufactured parts (components) in various ways that include cutting or certain other kinds of deformation.

With their inherent precision, machine tools enabled the economical production of interchangeable parts.

== Nomenclature and key concepts, interrelated ==
Many historians of technology consider that true machine tools were born when the toolpath first became guided by the machine itself in some way, at least to some extent, so that direct, freehand human guidance of the toolpath (with hands, feet, or mouth) was no longer the only guidance used in the cutting or forming process. In this view of the definition, the term, arising at a time when all tools up till then had been hand tools, simply provided a label for "tools that were machines instead of hand tools". Early lathes, those prior to the late medieval period, and modern woodworking lathes and potter's wheels may or may not fall under this definition, depending on how one views the headstock spindle itself; but the earliest historical records of a lathe with direct mechanical control of the cutting tool's path are of a screw-cutting lathe dating to about 1483. This lathe "produced screw threads out of wood and employed a true compound slide rest".

In the 1930s, the U.S. National Bureau of Economic Research (NBER) referenced the definition of a machine tool as "any machine operating by other than hand power which employs a tool to work on metal".

The narrowest colloquial sense of the term reserves it only for machines that perform metal cutting—in other words, the many kinds of conventional machining and grinding. These processes are a type of deformation that produces swarf. However, economists use a slightly broader sense that also includes metal deformation of other types that squeeze the metal into shape without cutting off swarf, such as rolling, stamping with dies, shearing, swaging, riveting, and others. Thus presses are usually included in the economic definition of machine tools. For example, this is the breadth of definition used by Max Holland in his history of Burgmaster and Houdaille, which is also a history of the machine tool industry in general from the 1940s through the 1980s; he was reflecting the sense of the term used by Houdaille itself and other firms in the industry. Many reports on machine tool export and import and similar economic topics use this broader definition.

The colloquial sense implying conventional metal cutting is also growing obsolete because of changing technology over the decades. The many more recently developed processes labeled "machining", such as electrical discharge machining, electrochemical machining, electron beam machining, photochemical machining, and ultrasonic machining, or even plasma cutting and water jet cutting, are often performed by machines that could most logically be called machine tools. In addition, some of the newly developed additive manufacturing processes, which are not about cutting away material but rather about adding it, are done by machines that are likely to end up labeled, in some cases, as machine tools. In fact, machine tool builders are already developing machines that include both subtractive and additive manufacturing in one work envelope, and retrofits of existing machines are underway.

In modern precision engineering, the accuracy of machine tool components is often maintained through the use of a Hirth joint. This coupling is the industry standard for high-accuracy positioning in components such as CNC rotary tables and tool turrets. Its straight-tooth geometry provides maximum static stiffness and positional repeatability, ensuring that the machine maintains micron-level alignment while resisting heavy cutting forces during the machining process.

== History ==
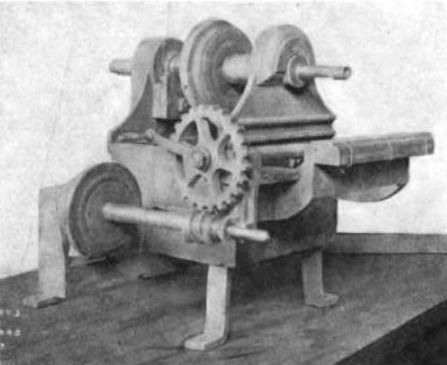
Eli Whitney milling machine, c. 1818

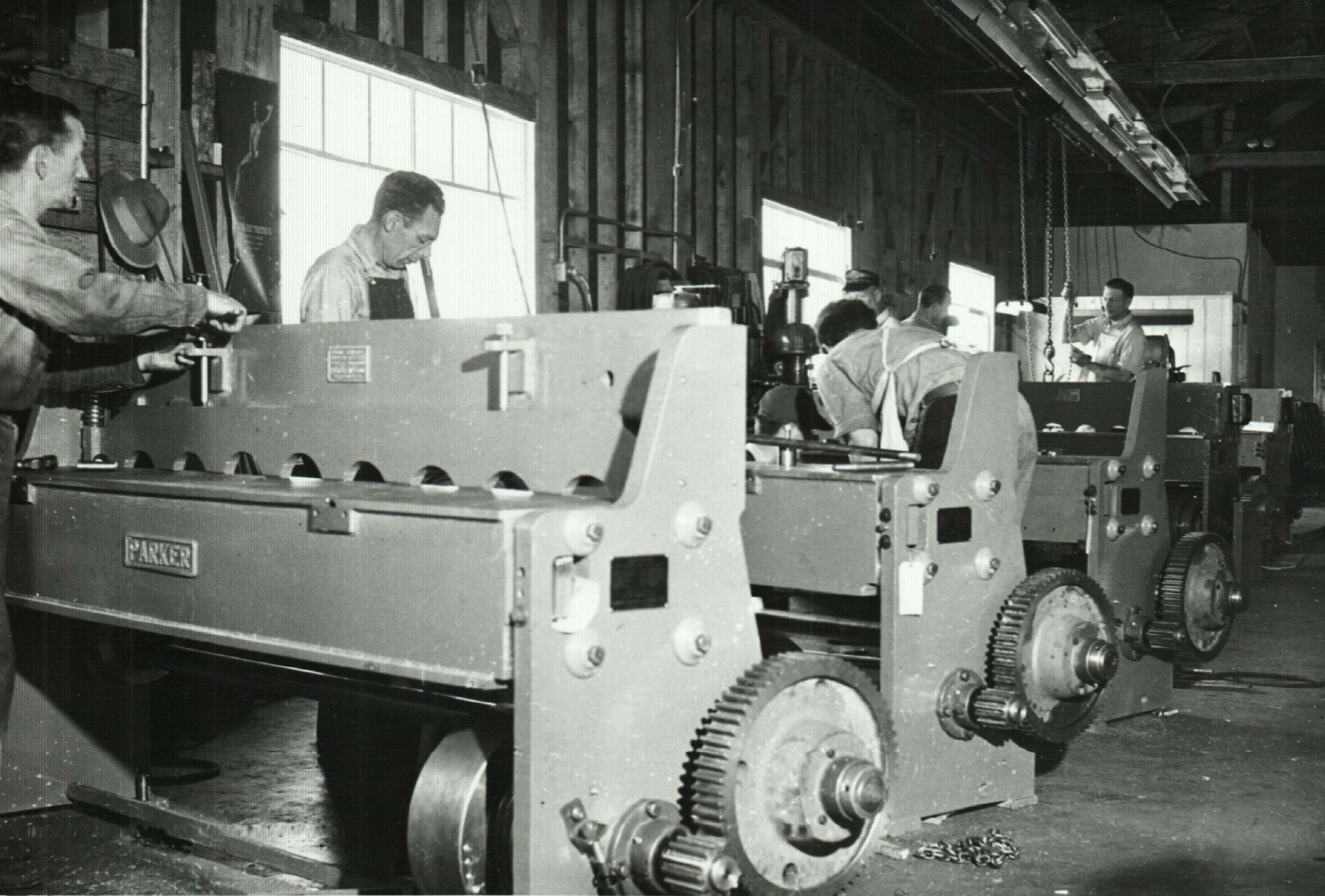
Parker Manufacturing Company shear tool

Forerunners of machine tools included bow drills and potter's wheels, which had existed in ancient Egypt prior to 2500 BC, and lathes, known to have existed in multiple regions of Europe since at least 1000 to 500 BC. But it was not until the later Middle Ages and the Age of Enlightenment that the modern concept of a machine tool—a class of machines used as tools in the making of metal parts, and incorporating machine-guided toolpath—began to evolve. Clockmakers of the Middle Ages and renaissance men such as Leonardo da Vinci helped expand humans' technological milieu toward the preconditions for industrial machine tools. During the 18th and 19th centuries, and even in many cases in the 20th, the builders of machine tools tended to be the same people who would then use them to produce the end products (manufactured goods). However, from these roots also evolved an industry of machine tool builders as we define them today, meaning people who specialize in building machine tools for sale to others.

Historians of machine tools often focus on a handful of major industries that most spurred machine tool development. In order of historical emergence, they have been firearms (small arms and artillery); clocks; textile machinery; steam engines (stationary, marine, rail, and otherwise) (the story of how Watt's need for an accurate cylinder spurred Boulton's boring machine is discussed by Roe); sewing machines; bicycles; automobiles; and aircraft. Others could be included in this list as well, but they tend to be connected with the root causes already listed. For example, rolling-element bearings are an industry of themselves, but this industry's main drivers of development were the vehicles already listed—trains, bicycles, automobiles, and aircraft; and other industries, such as tractors, farm implements, and tanks, borrowed heavily from those same parent industries.

Machine tools filled a need created by textile machinery during the Industrial Revolution in England in the middle to late 1700s. Until that time, machinery was made mostly from wood, often including gearing and shafts. The increase in mechanization required more metal parts, which were usually made of cast iron or wrought iron. Cast iron could be cast in molds for larger parts, such as engine cylinders and gears, but was difficult to work with a file and could not be hammered. Red hot wrought iron could be hammered into shapes. Room temperature wrought iron was worked with a file and chisel and could be made into gears and other complex parts; however, hand working lacked precision and was a slow and expensive process.

James Watt was unable to have an accurately bored cylinder for his first steam engine, trying for several years until John Wilkinson invented a suitable boring machine in 1774, boring Boulton & Watt's first commercial engine in 1776.

The advance in the accuracy of machine tools can be traced to Henry Maudslay and refined by Joseph Whitworth. That Maudslay had established the manufacture and use of master plane gages in his shop (Maudslay & Field) located on Westminster Road south of the Thames River in London about 1809, was attested to by James Nasmyth who was employed by Maudslay in 1829 and Nasmyth documented their use in his autobiography.

The process by which the master plane gages were produced dates back to antiquity but was refined to an unprecedented degree in the Maudslay shop. The process begins with three square plates each given an identification (ex., 1,2 and 3). The first step is to rub plates 1 and 2 together with a marking medium (called bluing today) revealing the high spots which would be removed by hand scraping with a steel scraper, until no irregularities were visible. This would not produce true plane surfaces but a "ball and socket" concave-concave and convex-convex fit, as this mechanical fit, like two perfect planes, can slide over each other and reveal no high spots. The rubbing and marking are repeated after rotating 2 relative to 1 by 90 degrees to eliminate concave-convex "potato-chip" curvature. Next, plate number 3 is compared and scraped to conform to plate number 1 in the same two trials. In this manner plates number 2 and 3 would be identical. Next plates number 2 and 3 would be checked against each other to determine what condition existed, either both plates were "balls" or "sockets" or "chips" or a combination. These would then be scraped until no high spots existed and then compared to plate number 1. Repeating this process of comparing and scraping the three plates could produce plane surfaces accurate to within millionths of an inch (the thickness of the marking medium).

The traditional method of producing the surface gages used an abrasive powder rubbed between the plates to remove the high spots, but it was Whitworth who contributed the refinement of replacing the grinding with hand scraping. Sometime after 1825, Whitworth went to work for Maudslay and it was there that Whitworth perfected the hand scraping of master surface plane gages. In his paper presented to the British Association for the Advancement of Science at Glasgow in 1840, Whitworth pointed out the inherent inaccuracy of grinding due to no control and thus unequal distribution of the abrasive material between the plates which would produce uneven removal of material from the plates.

With the creation of master plane gages of such high accuracy, all critical components of machine tools (i.e., guiding surfaces such as machine ways) could then be compared against them and scraped to the desired accuracy. The first machine tools offered for sale (i.e., commercially available) were constructed by Matthew Murray in England around 1800. Others, such as Henry Maudslay, James Nasmyth, and Joseph Whitworth, soon followed the path of expanding their entrepreneurship from manufactured end products and millwright work into the realm of building machine tools for sale.

Important early machine tools included the slide rest lathe, screw-cutting lathe, turret lathe, milling machine, pattern tracing lathe, shaper, and metal planer, which were all in use before 1840. With these machine tools the decades-old objective of producing interchangeable parts was finally realized. An important early example of something now taken for granted was the standardization of screw fasteners such as nuts and bolts. Before about the beginning of the 19th century, these were used in pairs, and even screws of the same machine were generally not interchangeable. Methods were developed to cut screw thread to a greater precision than that of the feed screw in the lathe being used. This led to the bar length standards of the 19th and early 20th centuries.

American production of machine tools was a critical factor in the Allies' victory in World War II. Production of machine tools tripled in the United States in the war. No war was more industrialized than World War II, and it has been written that the war was won as much by machine shops as by machine guns.

The production of machine tools is concentrated in about 10 countries worldwide: China, Japan, Germany, Italy, South Korea, Taiwan, Switzerland, US, Austria, Spain and a few others. Machine tool innovation continues in several public and private research centers worldwide.

== Drive power sources ==
[A]ll the turning of the iron for the cotton machinery built by Mr. Slater was done with hand chisels or tools in lathes turned by cranks with hand power.

— David Wilkinson

Machine tools can be powered from a variety of sources. Human and animal power (via cranks, treadles, treadmills, or treadwheels) were used in the past, as was water power (via water wheel); however, following the development of high-pressure steam engines in the mid 19th century, factories increasingly used steam power. Factories also used hydraulic and pneumatic power. Many small workshops continued to use water, human and animal power until electrification after 1900.

Today most machine tools are powered by electricity; hydraulic and pneumatic power are sometimes used, but this is uncommon.

== Automatic control ==
Machine tools can be operated manually, or under automatic control. Early machines used flywheels to stabilize their motion and had complex systems of gears and levers to control the machine and the piece being worked on. Soon after World War II, the numerical control (NC) machine was developed. NC machines used a series of numbers punched on paper tape or punched cards to control their motion. In the 1960s, computers were added to give even more flexibility to the process. Such machines became known as computerized numerical control (CNC) machines. NC and CNC machines could precisely repeat sequences over and over, and could produce much more complex pieces than even the most skilled tool operators.

Before long, the machines could automatically change the specific cutting and shaping tools that were being used. For example, a drill machine might contain a magazine with a variety of drill bits for producing holes of various sizes. Previously, either machine operators would usually have to manually change the bit or move the work piece to another station to perform these different operations. The next logical step was to combine several different machine tools together, all under computer control. These are known as machining centers, and have dramatically changed the way parts are made.

== Examples ==
Examples of machine tools are:

- Broaching machine
- Drill press
- Gear shaper
- Hobbing machine
- Hone
- Lathe
- Honing Machine
- Screw machines
- Milling machine
- Shear (sheet metal)
- Shaper
- Bandsaw
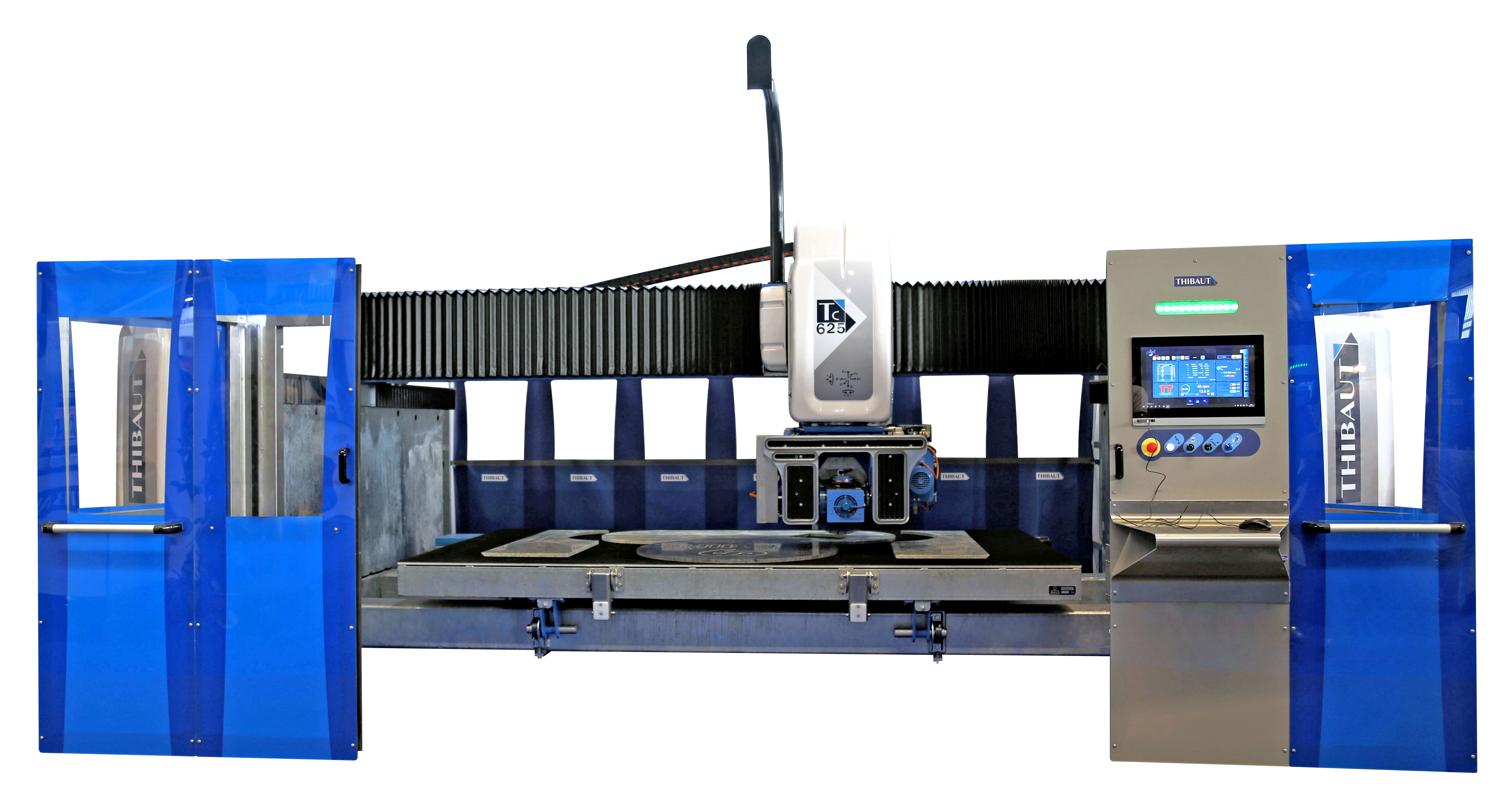
  5 axis bridge saw
  Saws
- Planer
- Stewart platform mills
- Grinding machines
- Multitasking machines (MTMs)—CNC machine tools with many axes that combine turning, milling, grinding, and material handling into one highly automated machine tool

When fabricating or shaping parts, several techniques are used to remove unwanted metal. Among these are:

- Electrical discharge machining
- Grinding (abrasive cutting)
- Multiple edge cutting tools
- Single edge cutting tools

Other techniques are used to add desired material. Devices that fabricate components by selective addition of material are called rapid prototyping machines.

== See also ==
- Category:Machine tool builders
- Damped machining tools
- Epoxy granite
- Four slide machine
- Machine tool dynamometer
- Machine Tool Standards (ASME)
- Machine tool builder
- Machining vibrations
- Machinist calculator
- Metalworking
- Numerical control
- Self-replicating machine
- Swarf
- Tool bit
- Tool wear
- Tool Ways
- Types of press tools

== Bibliography ==
- Holland, Max (1989), When the Machine Stopped: A Cautionary Tale from Industrial America, Boston: Harvard Business School Press, ISBN 978-0-87584-208-0, OCLC 246343673. A history most specifically of Burgmaster, which specialized in turret drills; but in telling Burgmaster's story, and that of its acquirer Houdaille, Holland provides a history of the machine tool industry in general between World War II and the 1980s that ranks with Noble's coverage of the same era (Noble 1984) as a seminal history. Later republished under the title From Industry to Alchemy: Burgmaster, a Machine Tool Company.
- Jerome, Harry (1934), "Mechanization in Industry", NBER, Cambridge, Massachusetts, US: US National Bureau of Economic Research.
- Moore, Wayne R. (1970), Foundations of Mechanical Accuracy (1st ed.), Bridgeport, Connecticut, US: Moore Special Tool Co., LCCN 73127307. The Moore family firm, the Moore Special Tool Company, independently invented the jig borer (contemporaneously with its Swiss invention), and Moore's monograph is a seminal classic of the principles of machine tool design and construction that yield the highest possible accuracy and precision in machine tools (second only to that of metrological machines). The Moore firm epitomized the art and science of the tool and die maker.
- Roe, Joseph Wickham (1916), English and American Tool Builders, New Haven, Connecticut: Yale University Press, LCCN 16011753. Reprinted by McGraw-Hill, New York and London, 1926 (LCCN 27-24075); and by Lindsay Publications, Inc., Bradley, Illinois (ISBN 978-0-917914-73-7).. A seminal classic of machine tool history. Extensively cited by later works.
- Thomson, Ross (2009), Structures of Change in the Mechanical Age: Technological Invention in the United States 1790-1865, Baltimore, MD: The Johns Hopkins University Press, ISBN 978-0-8018-9141-0
- Woodbury, Robert S. (1972a). "History of the Lathe to 1850: A Study in the Growth of a Technical Element of an Industrial Economy". In Woodbury (1972).
- Woodbury, Robert S. (1972) [1961], Studies in the History of Machine Tools, Cambridge, Massachusetts, US, and London, England: MIT Press, ISBN 978-0-262-73033-4, LCCN 72006354. Collection of previously published monographs bound as one volume. A collection of seminal classics of machine tool history.
