= Machinist =

Skilled operator of machine tools

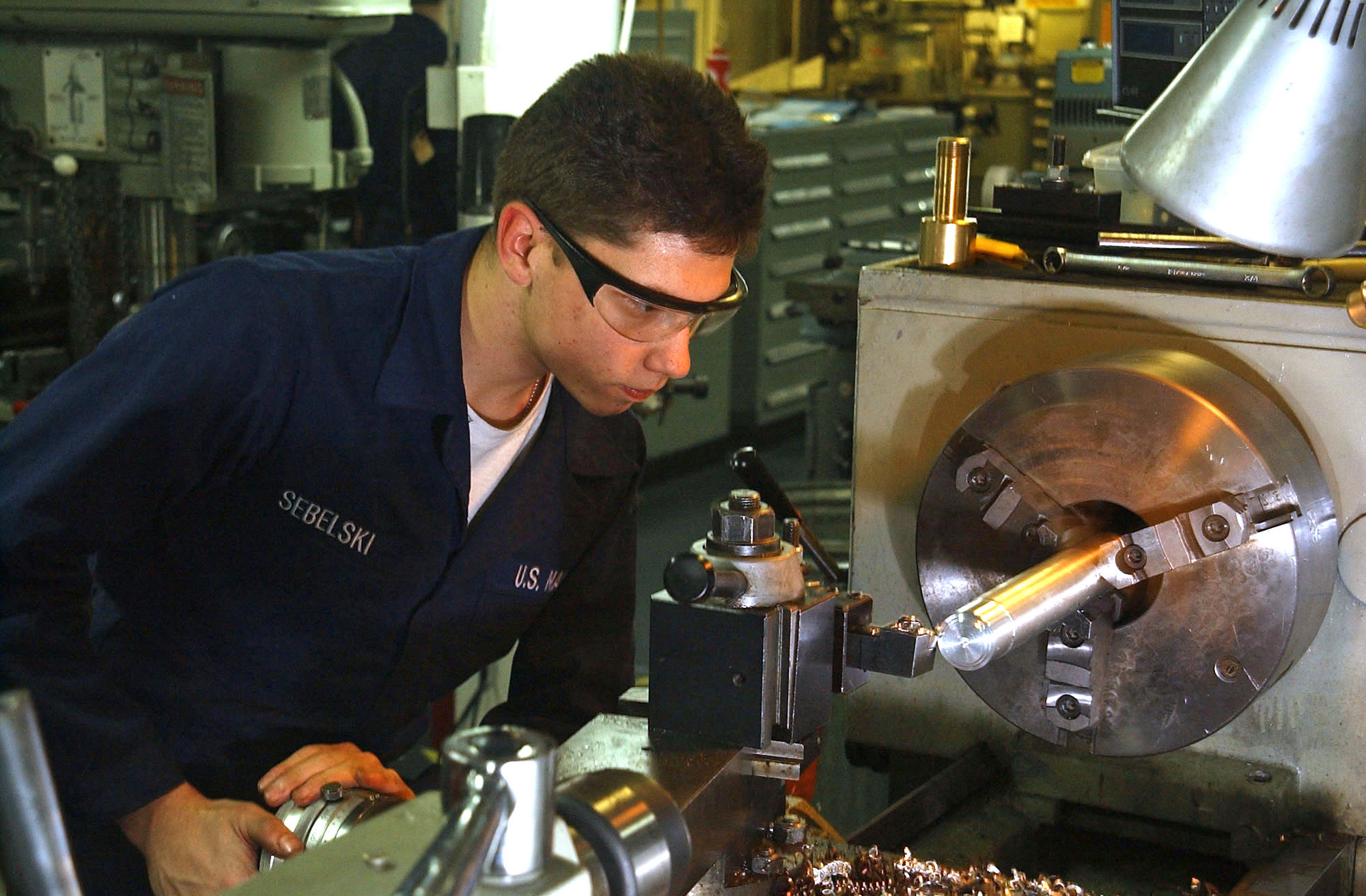
- Machinist, operating a metal lathe

Occupation
- Occupation type: Vocational
- Activity sectors: Industrial manufacturing

Description
- Competencies: Patience, steady hand, ability to read plans, attention to detail, physically strong
- Education required: trade school, Apprenticeship
- Fields of employment: Industrial manufacturing
- Related jobs: Millwright

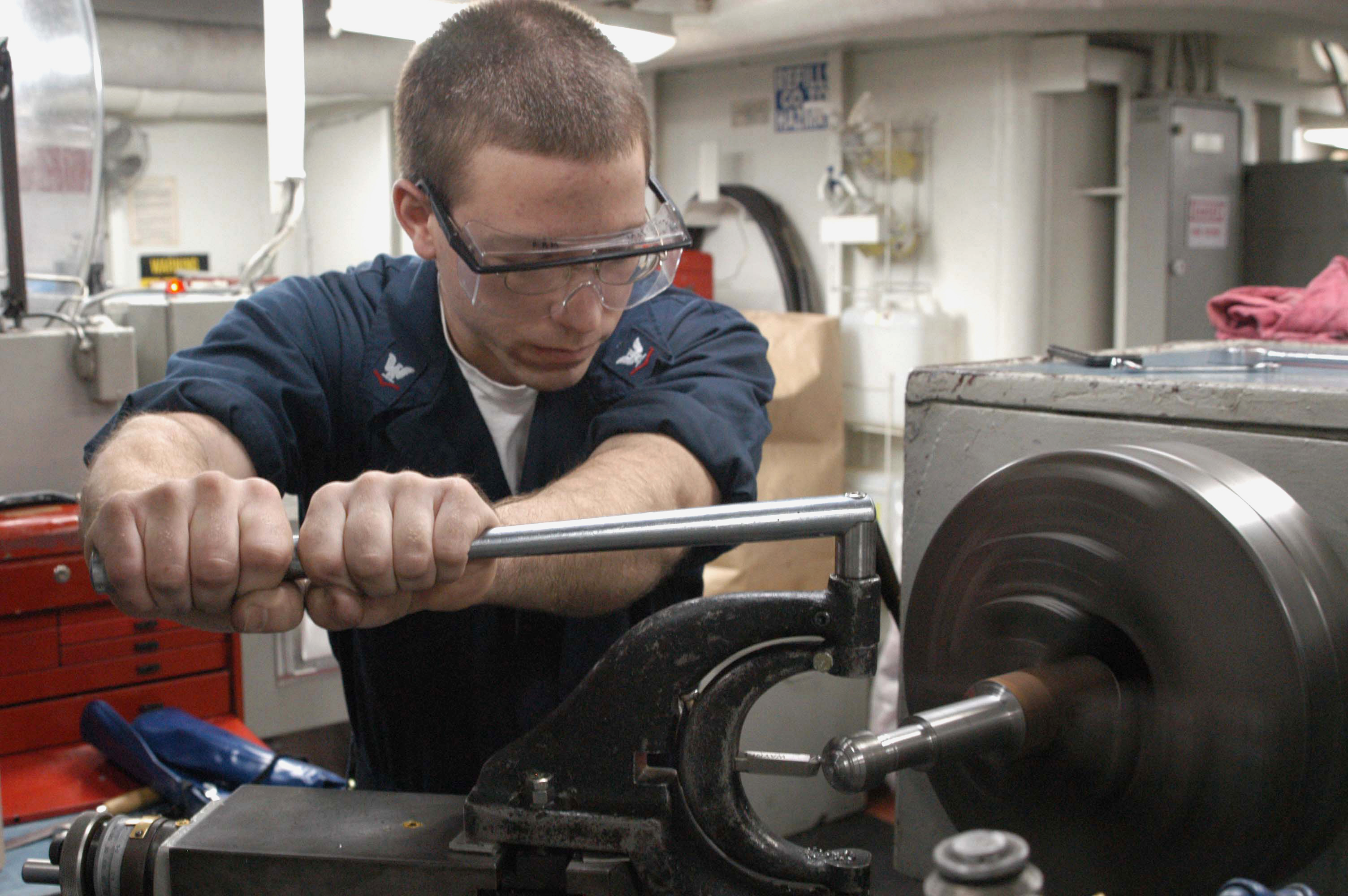
Machinery repairman creates helicopter part aboard an aircraft carrier

A machinist is a tradesperson or trained professional who operates machine tools, and has the ability to set up tools such as milling machines, grinders, lathes, and drilling machines.

A competent machinist will generally have a strong mechanical aptitude, the ability to correctly use precision measuring instruments and to interpret blueprints, and a working knowledge of the proper parameters required for successfully utilizing the various tools commonly used in machining operations. CNC (computer numerical control) comprises one of the most recent advances in manufacturing, in which a machinist uses specialized software to generate programmatic instructions (most commonly G-code) which are in turn interpreted by the machine to make components for a wide variety of industries. CNC programming is a skilled position which requires knowledge of math, speeds and feeds, machine tooling, work holding, and the different ways various materials react to stress and heat in the machining process.

== Nature of work ==
The machine trade is an extremely broad field with a wide variety of workplaces, job duties, and types of work. Most machinists work in machine shops and factories where they operate machinery that produce precision component parts. In general, the occupation is exacting, and requires extensive knowledge of the tools and processes in order to achieve the tight tolerances and surface finishes that these parts specify.

Many machinists make mass-produced parts using highly automated computer numerical control machines which are common today, but still require such professionals to set up and calibrate the machines. Other more specialised machinists produce custom-made parts for prototyping, repair, or research. A machinist may work on manufacturing something relatively simple like a bracket, or a shaft, or something extraordinarily complex, such as aerospace components accurate to 5 micrometres.

== Related occupational titles ==
Some titles reflect further development of machinist skills such as tool and die maker, patternmaker, mold maker, programmer, and operator. A machinist is one who is called on to fix a problem with a part or to create a new one using metals, plastics, or rarely, wood. Depending on the company, a machinist can be any or all of the titles listed above.

Other related fields include millwrights, quality assurance, and mechanical engineers.

In Australia and New Zealand, a related profession is a fitter and turner. A fitter and turner is the tradesperson who fits, assembles, grinds and shapes metal parts and subassemblies to fabricate production machines and other equipment.

Under the machinist title are other specialty titles that refer to specific skills that may be more highly developed to meet the needs of a particular job position, such as fitter (assembles parts), turning hand, mill hand, and grinder.

== Role in manufacturing ==
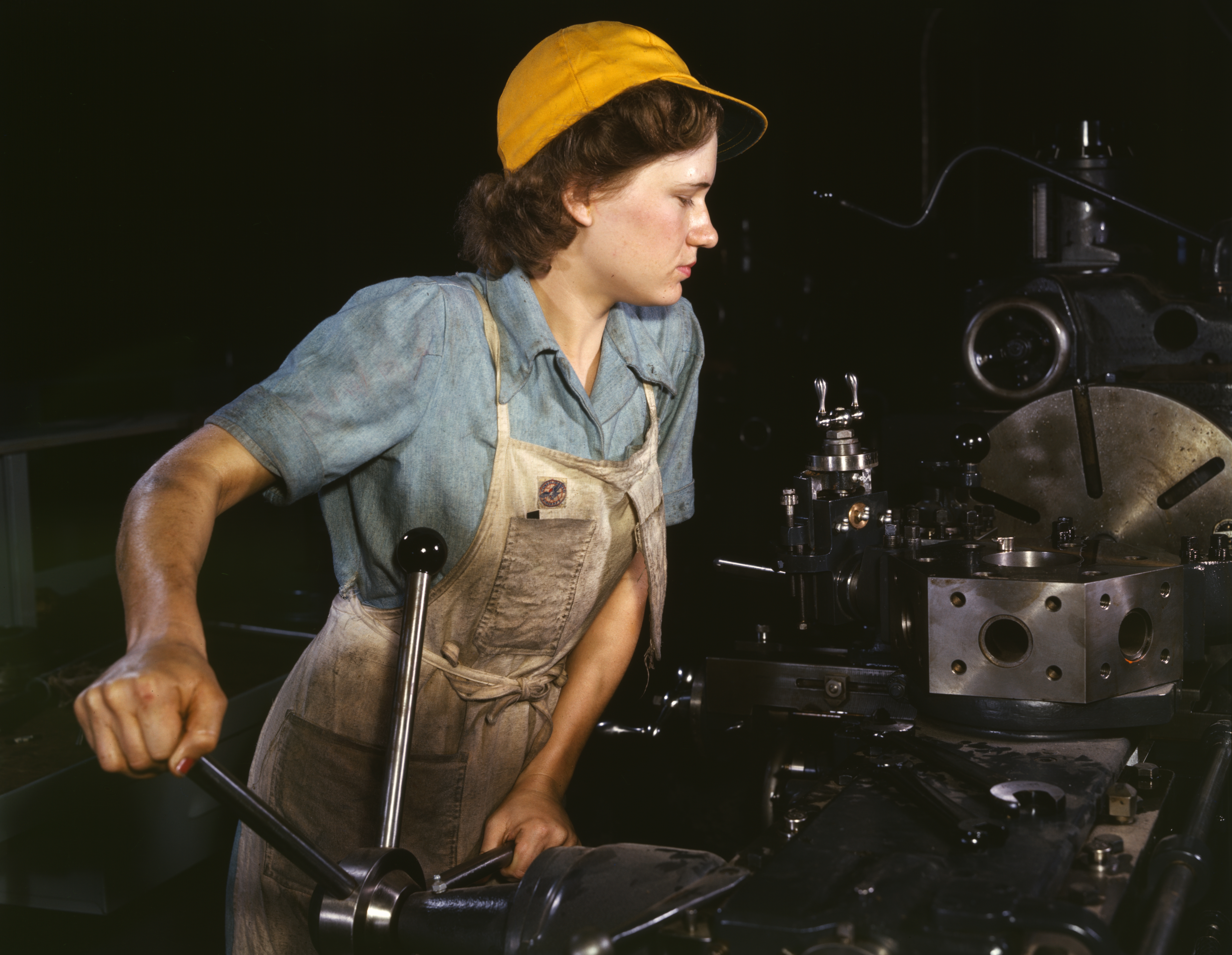
Many women worked as machinists in the United States during World War II, sometimes referred to as 'Rosies'.

A machinist is usually called upon when a part needs to be produced from a stock material by cutting. Such a part may be unique or may be needed in the thousands. The part could be anything made from metal or plastic, though machined parts are usually ones that require high precision and cannot be produced by other means. Machinists generally start with a saw cut length of stock or a casting. Producing a part will often require several steps and more than one machine tool. Each machine tool plays a specific role in cutting away excess material. When large numbers of parts are needed, production planning is required to plan the most logical workflow through a series of machines. Computer numerical controlled (CNC) machines are computer-driven tools that can machine a large variety of shapes, and whose use in the workflow depends on the part to be machined.

CNC machines are becoming the standard due to their speed, precision, flexibility, repeatability, and reduced downtime while changing jobs. Production runs consisting of large numbers of parts are more cost effective and commonly referred to as production work in the trade. Conversely, small production runs are sometimes referred to as prototype or jobbing work.

Production engineers use blueprints and engineering drawings to produce detailed specifications of the part, especially its geometry (shape), then decide on a strategy to make it. Machine tools are then configured by the machinist and production commences. The machinist works with the quality department to ensure the specifications are maintained in the finished product.

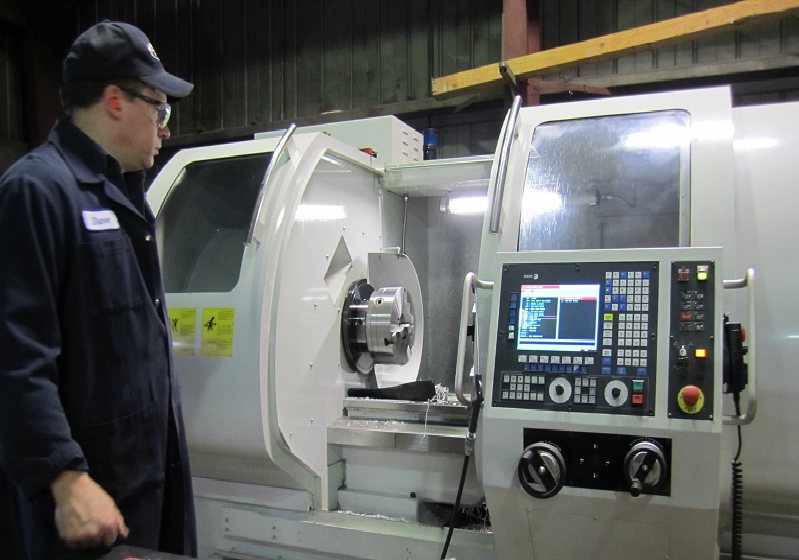
Machinist inspecting a CNC lathe

Large commercial organizations often staff machinists on site in a maintenance mode to ensure continuing operations of the production machinery. Such machinists can often make replacement parts the same day. Because of this, the labor cost for this role are significantly lower than costs involved with production shutdowns.

== Additive machining ==
Additive machining means 3D printing to create industrial components, prototypes, tooling, and end-use production parts. Additive machining comes into its own in the manufacturing of very small intricate parts, which could not be produced through any other manufacturing process. There are several processes in additive manufacturing which include direct metal deposition: electron beam melting, fused filament fabrication, select laser sintering, and variations of them.

== Materials commonly encountered by machinists ==
The most common materials that machinists make parts from are steel, aluminium, brass, copper, and various alloys of these materials. Other less common materials such as vanadium, zinc, lead, or manganese are often used as alloying elements for the most common materials. Materials that machinists work with occasionally are plastics, rubber, glass, and wood products. Rarely, machinists also work with exotic and refractory metals. The term exotic metals is a general term describing out of the ordinary, rare or special purpose metals. A synonym might be space-age. A list of exotic metals might include, but is not limited to, titanium, beryllium, vanadium, chromium, molybdenum and tungsten, as well as special high-temperature metal alloys like Inconel or Hastelloy (superalloys). Very often the meaning of the term suggests the need for specialized handling and/or tooling to machine them effectively.

While the foregoing were primarily the materials that a machinist would be cutting, the cutters that the machinist uses must be harder and tougher than the materials to be cut. The materials in the cutters a machinist uses are most commonly high-speed steel, tungsten carbide, ceramics, Borazon, and diamond.

Machinists usually work to very small tolerances, usually within 0.010" or 0.25 mm (more commonly expressed as ±0.005" (Plus or minus five thousandths of an inch) or ±0.13 mm), and sometimes at tolerances as low as +/-0.0001" (plus or minus one tenth of a thousandth of an inch – or 0.0025 mm) for specialty operations. A machinist deals with all facets of shaping, cutting and some aspects of forming metal, although forming is typically a separate trade. The operations most commonly performed by machinists are milling, drilling, turning, and grinding. There are other more specialized operations that a machinist will less frequently be called upon to perform such as honing, keyseating, lapping, and polishing, to name a few.

== Tools of the machinist ==
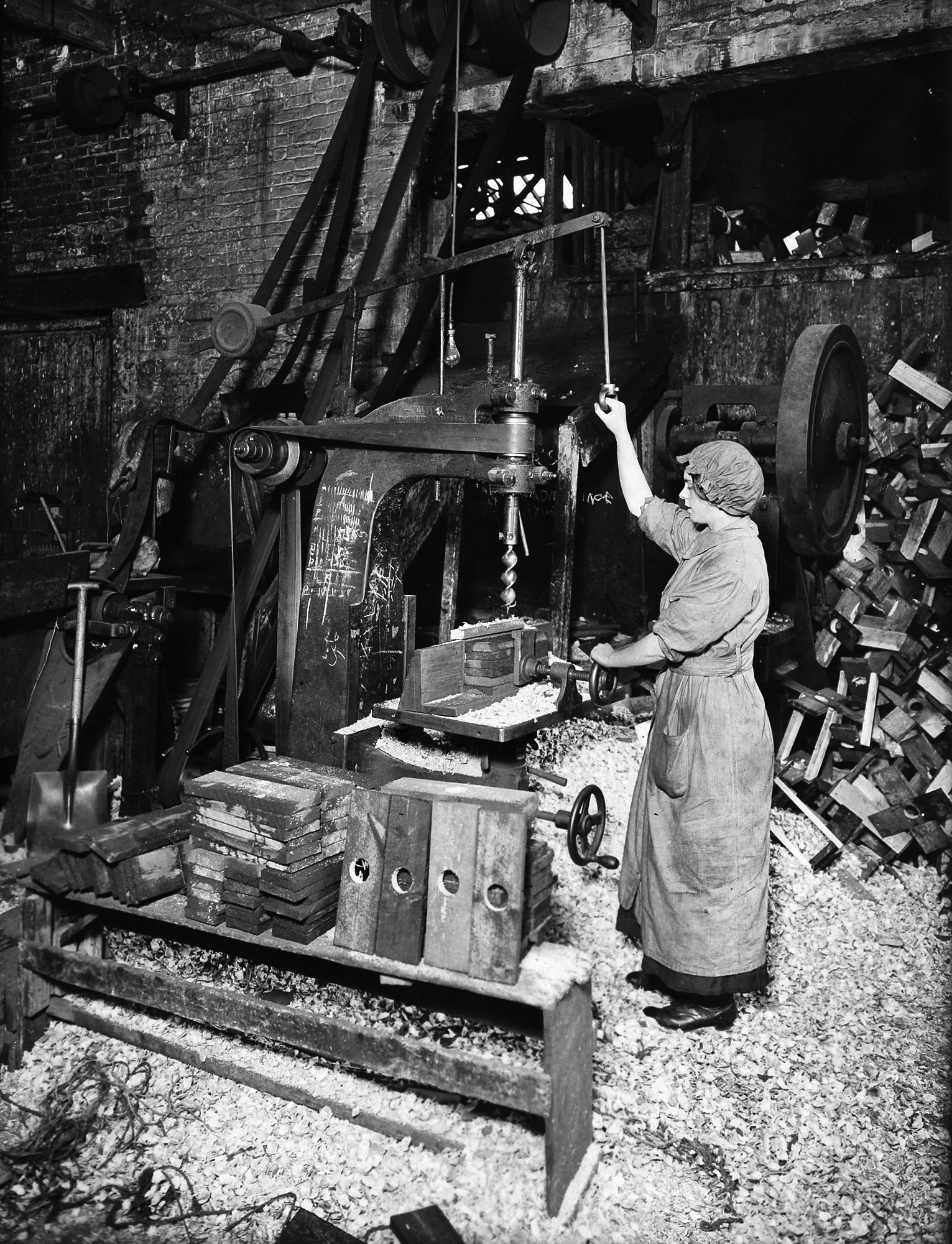
A machinist operating a drill press in 1917

The tools that a machinist is expected to be proficient with fall into broad categories:

- Measuring tools: The measuring tools come in several basic varieties:
  - Comparison tools such as adjustable parallels and plain calipers,
  - Direct reading tools such as rules, scales, and vernier calipers,
  - Micrometer tools based on screw threads,
  - Indicator tools based on clockwork gear movements,
  - Electronic measuring tools based on transducers. Many of these are digital versions of their mechanical predecessors, as with a digital caliper.
  - coordinate measuring machines, which plot cartesian points around the surfaces of a part to generate a digital model that can be compared against the CAD drawing
  - optical comparators, which magnify the silhouette of a part onto a screen so small features can be more easily inspected
  - surface roughness testers,
- Hand tools: The hand tools are the usual complement of tools found in a complete auto mechanic's set except that auto specialty tools would be absent and some outsized tools would likely be present, such as 1 1/2 inches (38 mm) open end wrench.
- Deburring tools: These are tools such as files, stones, die grinders, picks and blades used to remove burrs and break sharp edges often left on machined parts
- Machine tools: The machine tools have undergone a dramatic shift in the last 20 years. Manual machines have given way to computer numerically controlled machines (CNCs). For clarity's sake a categorization based on the historical groupings will be offered. Each of these groupings has been altered by the advent of CNCs and the CNCs meld some groups and blur the lines between others. The most common machine tools fall into five categories:
  - Drilling machines, bench, floor, radial, and horizontal
  - Milling machines, horizontal, vertical, and boring mills, 4 and 5 axis mills
  - Turning machines, engine lathe, turret lathe, vertical turret lathe, vertical boring mill, Swiss lathe
  - Grinding machines, surface, cylindrical, centerless, universal
  - Electric Discharge Machines, wire, sinker,
- Work holders: The work holders may include vises, chucks, clamps, indexing accessories, pallets, specialty jigs or fixtures, and faceplates.
- Tool holders: The tool holders may include chucks, cutter adapters, cutter extensions, tool posts, indexable turrets, box tools, quick change adapters, arbors, shrink fit, and collets.
- Cutting tools: Cutting tools include various milling cutters such as face mills, shell mills, endmills, and form cutters; various drills, reamers, taps, countersinks, counterbores, and core drills; various turning tools, form tools, and threading tools; various grinding wheels distinguished by their geometry, bond, grit size, and compound.
- Charts and reference materials: such as tap drill charts, conversion charts, thread tolerance charts, ASME and ISO specifications, machine tool manuals, and tooling feeds and speeds charts.

== See also ==
- List of metalworking occupations
- Machinist calculator
- International Association of Machinists and Aerospace Workers
- Machining
