= Felicity effect =

The Felicity effect in Physics, is an effect observed during acoustic emission in a structure undergoing repeated mechanical loading.

It negates the effect of emission silence in the structure that is often observed from the related Kaiser effect at high loads. A material demonstrating the Felicity effect gives off acoustic emission at a lower load than one previously reached in an increasing load cycle regime.

== See also ==
- Ultrasonic homogenizer
- Ultrasonic testing
