= Kaiser effect =

Kaiser effect may refer to:

- Kaiser effect (cosmology)
- Kaiser effect (material science)
