= C. J. Pauli =

German-born American photographer and printer

Clemens Johannes Pauli (1835–1896) was a German-born American photographer and printer who produced panoramic maps with accompanying lists of landmarks at his printing company in Milwaukee, Wisconsin. Several are held at the Library of Congress.

He served the U.S. Engineer Office in 1872 supervising surveying and sounding work.

Locations he made panoramic maps of include:

- Ashland, Wisconsin
- Benton Harbor, Michigan
- Cedar Rapids, Iowa
- Horicon, Wisconsin.
- Peoria, Illinois
- Port Huron, Michigan
- South Bend, Indiana
- Winona, Minnesota

== Gallery ==
Winona, Minnesota 1889

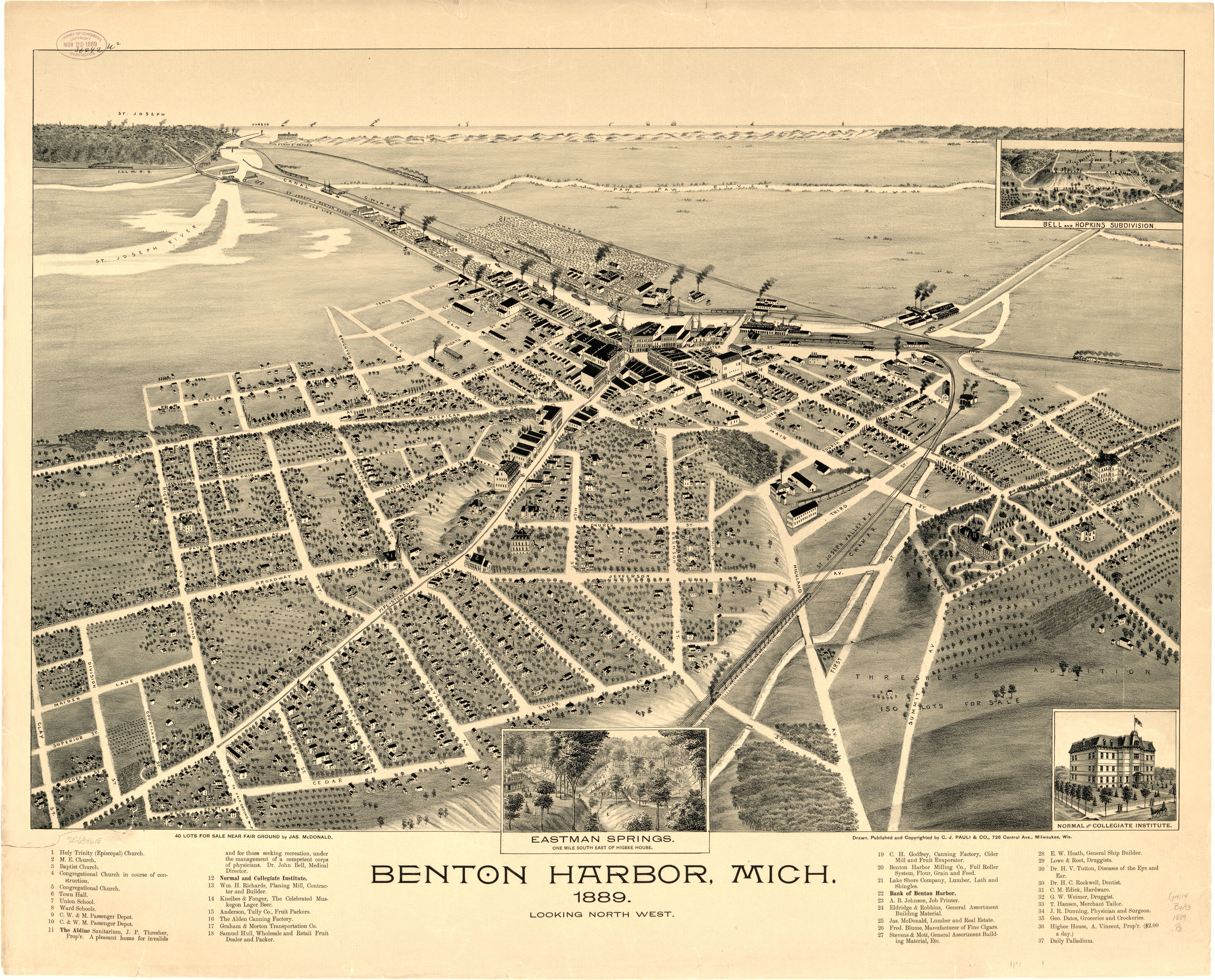
Benton Harbor, Michigan 1889 with inset image of Eastman Springs

South Bend, Indiana 1890 with inset depiction of Coquillard Park

Ashland, Wisconsin 1890 "population 16,000 increase in ten years 11,000"

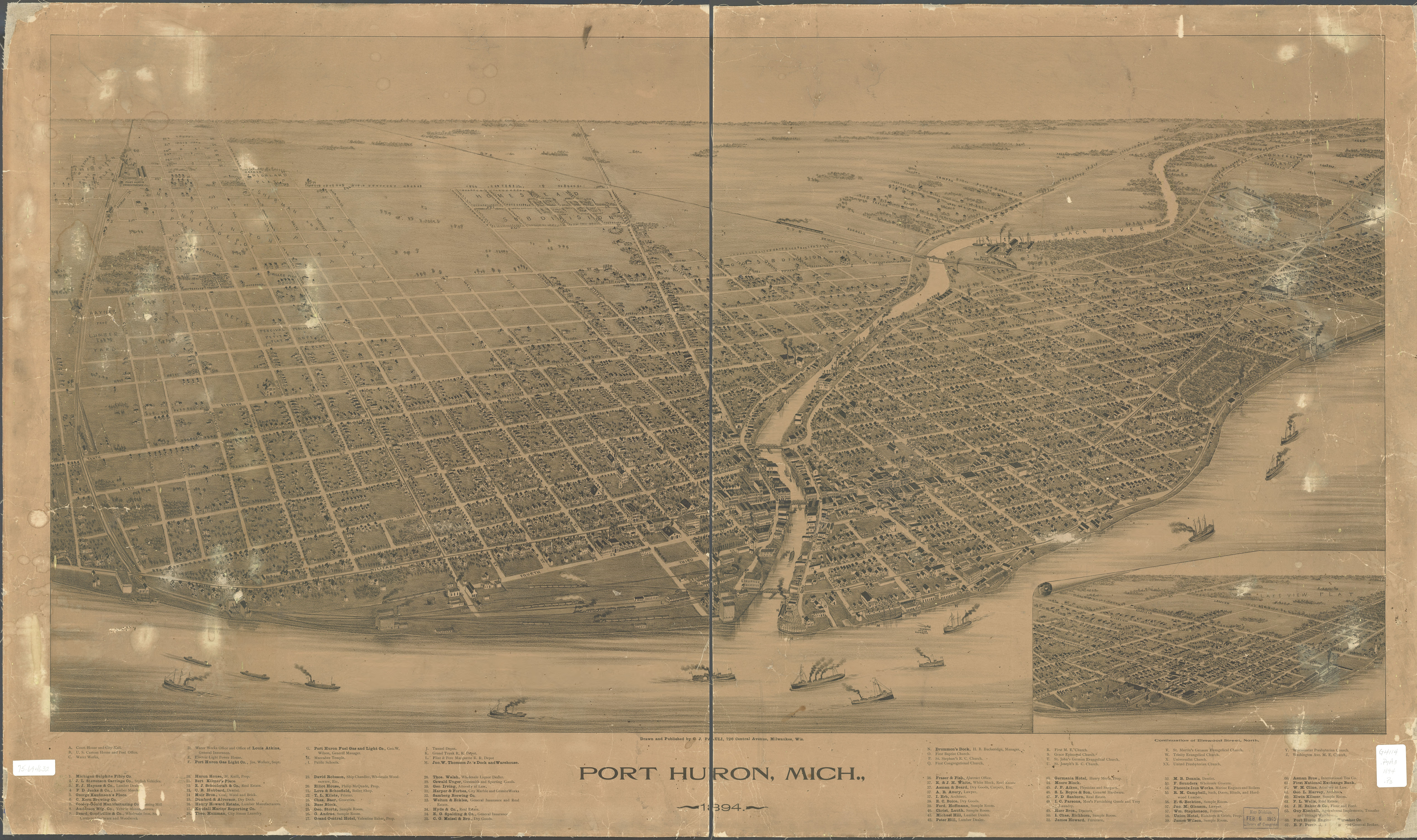
Port Huron, Michigan
