= Horicon, Wisconsin =

- City
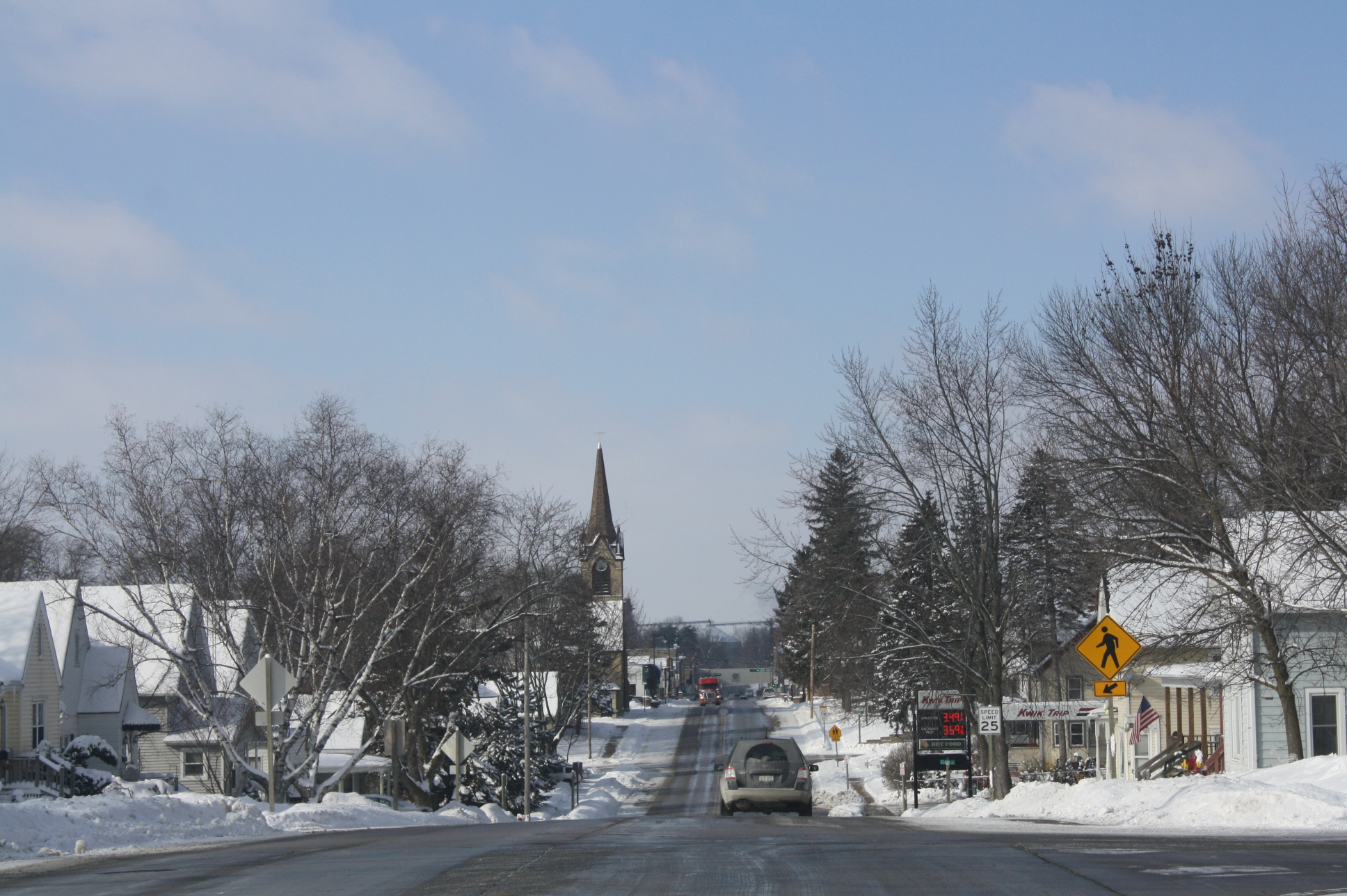
- Looking west at downtown Horicon

- Location of Horicon in Dodge County, Wisconsin

- Location within Wisconsin Location within the United States
- Coordinates: 43°27′N 88°39′W
- Country: United States
- State: Wisconsin
- County: Dodge

Area
  - Total: 3.64 sq mi (9.42 km^{2})
  - Land: 3.49 sq mi (9.05 km^{2})
  - Water: 0.14 sq mi (0.37 km^{2})
- Elevation: 879 ft (268 m)

Population (2020)
  - Total: 3,767
  - Density: 1,080/sq mi (416/km^{2})
- Time zone: UTC-6 (Central (CST))
  - Summer (DST): UTC-5 (CDT)
- Area code: 920
- FIPS code: 55-35750
- GNIS feature ID: 1566696
- Website: www.horiconwi.gov

Horicon is a city in Dodge County, Wisconsin, United States. The population was 3,767 at the 2020 census.

== Geography ==
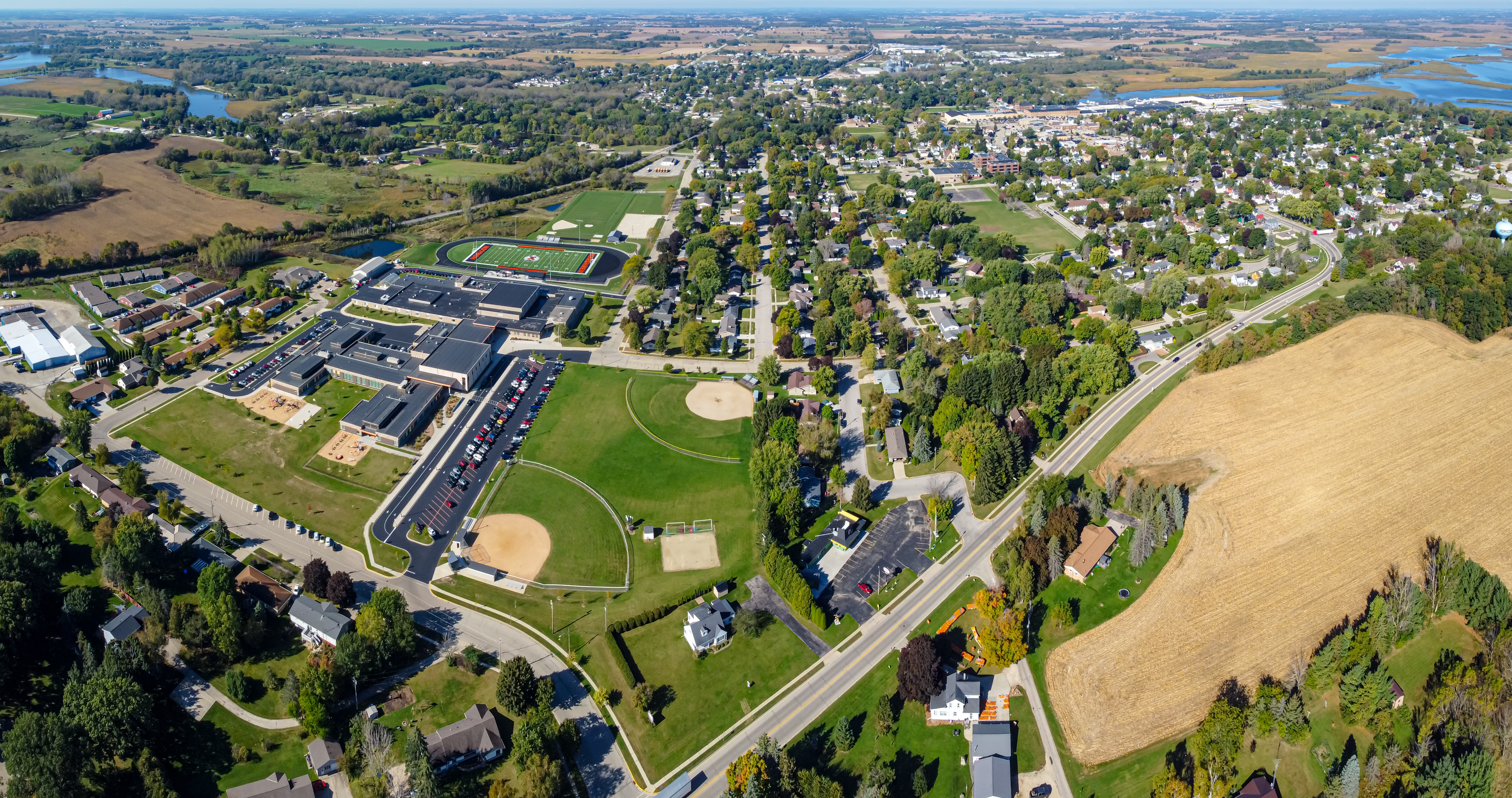

Horicon is located at 43°27′N 88°39′W (43.4482, -88.6329). According to the United States Census Bureau, the city has a total area of 3.42 square miles (8.86 km^{2}), of which 3.21 square miles (8.31 km^{2}) is land and 0.21 square miles (0.54 km^{2}) is water.

The city is situated at the southernmost tip of the Horicon Marsh. Tourists flock to the area every year to see the migration of the Canada geese.

=== Climate ===
Climate data for Horicon Wastewater Treatment Plant, Wisconsin (1991–2020 normals, extremes 1970–present)
Month	Jan	Feb	Mar	Apr	May	Jun	Jul	Aug	Sep	Oct	Nov	Dec	Year
Record high °F (°C)	55 (13)	70 (21)	83 (28)	89 (32)	93 (34)	99 (37)	102 (39)	100 (38)	95 (35)	87 (31)	74 (23)	66 (19)	102 (39)
Mean maximum °F (°C)	45.3 (7.4)	49.6 (9.8)	64.9 (18.3)	77.2 (25.1)	84.9 (29.4)	89.8 (32.1)	90.8 (32.7)	89.1 (31.7)	86.9 (30.5)	79.1 (26.2)	63.8 (17.7)	50.1 (10.1)	93.1 (33.9)
Mean daily maximum °F (°C)	25.3 (−3.7)	29.5 (−1.4)	41.1 (5.1)	54.5 (12.5)	66.9 (19.4)	76.3 (24.6)	80.2 (26.8)	78.4 (25.8)	71.7 (22.1)	58.4 (14.7)	43.5 (6.4)	30.8 (−0.7)	54.7 (12.6)
Daily mean °F (°C)	17.0 (−8.3)	20.4 (−6.4)	31.8 (−0.1)	44.3 (6.8)	56.4 (13.6)	66.0 (18.9)	70.1 (21.2)	68.3 (20.2)	60.9 (16.1)	48.3 (9.1)	35.1 (1.7)	23.3 (−4.8)	45.2 (7.3)
Mean daily minimum °F (°C)	8.6 (−13.0)	11.4 (−11.4)	22.6 (−5.2)	34.2 (1.2)	45.9 (7.7)	55.8 (13.2)	59.9 (15.5)	58.1 (14.5)	50.0 (10.0)	38.3 (3.5)	26.8 (−2.9)	15.9 (−8.9)	35.6 (2.0)
Mean minimum °F (°C)	−12.9 (−24.9)	−8.9 (−22.7)	2.4 (−16.4)	21.9 (−5.6)	32.9 (0.5)	43.2 (6.2)	50.8 (10.4)	48.6 (9.2)	36.5 (2.5)	25.5 (−3.6)	12.3 (−10.9)	−4.2 (−20.1)	−17.3 (−27.4)
Record low °F (°C)	−36 (−38)	−31 (−35)	−15 (−26)	9 (−13)	22 (−6)	30 (−1)	42 (6)	38 (3)	24 (−4)	14 (−10)	−10 (−23)	−25 (−32)	−36 (−38)
Average precipitation inches (mm)	1.45 (37)	1.33 (34)	1.91 (49)	3.75 (95)	3.88 (99)	4.98 (126)	4.22 (107)	3.70 (94)	3.42 (87)	3.05 (77)	1.94 (49)	1.67 (42)	35.30 (897)
Average snowfall inches (cm)	10.9 (28)	10.1 (26)	5.2 (13)	1.7 (4.3)	0.0 (0.0)	0.0 (0.0)	0.0 (0.0)	0.0 (0.0)	0.0 (0.0)	0.4 (1.0)	2.3 (5.8)	10.2 (26)	40.8 (104)
Average precipitation days (≥ 0.01 in)	8.7	8.2	8.6	10.7	11.9	10.8	10.0	9.0	8.7	9.9	8.6	9.0	114.1
Average snowy days (≥ 0.1 in)	6.3	6.0	2.9	0.8	0.0	0.0	0.0	0.0	0.0	0.2	1.7	5.6	23.5
Source: NOAA

== Demographics ==
Historical population
Census	Pop.	Note	%±
1880	1,250		—
1890	1,354		8.3%
1900	1,376		1.6%
1910	1,881		36.7%
1920	2,134		13.5%
1930	2,214		3.7%
1940	2,253		1.8%
1950	2,664		18.2%
1960	2,996		12.5%
1970	3,356		12.0%
1980	3,584		6.8%
1990	3,873		8.1%
2000	3,775		−2.5%
2010	3,655		−3.2%
2020	3,767		3.1%
U.S. Decennial Census

=== 2010 census ===
As of the census of 2010, there were 3,655 people, 1,497 households, and 1,006 families living in the city. The population density was 1,138.6 inhabitants per square mile (439.6/km^{2}). There were 1,620 housing units at an average density of 504.7 per square mile (194.9/km^{2}). The racial makeup of the city was 95.7% White, 0.4% African American, 0.1% Native American, 0.7% Asian, 1.6% from other races, and 1.5% from two or more races. Hispanic or Latino people of any race were 4.1% of the population.

There were 1,497 households, of which 31.5% had children under the age of 18 living with them, 53.3% were married couples living together, 9.2% had a female householder with no husband present, 4.7% had a male householder with no wife present, and 32.8% were non-families. 27.0% of all households were made up of individuals, and 9.5% had someone living alone who was 65 years of age or older. The average household size was 2.42 and the average family size was 2.94.

The median age in the city was 38.7 years. 24.2% of residents were under the age of 18; 7.9% were between the ages of 18 and 24; 26.7% were from 25 to 44; 27.9% were from 45 to 64; and 13.4% were 65 years of age or older. The gender makeup of the city was 50.1% male and 49.9% female.

=== 2000 census ===
As of the census of 2000, there were 3,775 people, 1,474 households, and 1,037 families living in the city. The population density was 1,126.8 people per square mile (435.1/km^{2}). There were 1,584 housing units at an average density of 472.8 per square mile (182.6/km^{2}). The racial makeup of the city was 97.59% White, 0.40% African American, 0.19% Native American, 0.19% Asian, 0.08% Pacific Islander, 1.03% from other races, and 0.53% from two or more races. 2.09% of the population were Hispanic or Latino people of any race.

There were 1,474 households, out of which 34.8% had children under the age of 18 living with them, 58.5% were married couples living together, 7.7% had a female householder with no husband present, and 29.6% were non-families. 25.4% of all households were made up of individuals, and 10.5% had someone living alone who was 65 years of age or older. The average household size was 2.56 and the average family size was 3.06.

In the city, the population was spread out, with 26.6% under the age of 18, 8.5% from 18 to 24, 30.3% from 25 to 44, 22.0% from 45 to 64, and 12.7% who were 65 years of age or older. The median age was 36 years. For every 100 females, there were 98.6 males. For every 100 females age 18 and over, there were 97.3 males.

The median income for a household in the city was $50,577, and the median income for a family was $58,393. Males had a median income of $38,008 versus $26,278 for females. The per capita income for the city was $21,690. 2.1% of the population and 0.6% of families were below the poverty line. Out of the total population, 1.6% of those under the age of 18 and 0.4% of those 65 and older were living below the poverty line.

== Economy ==
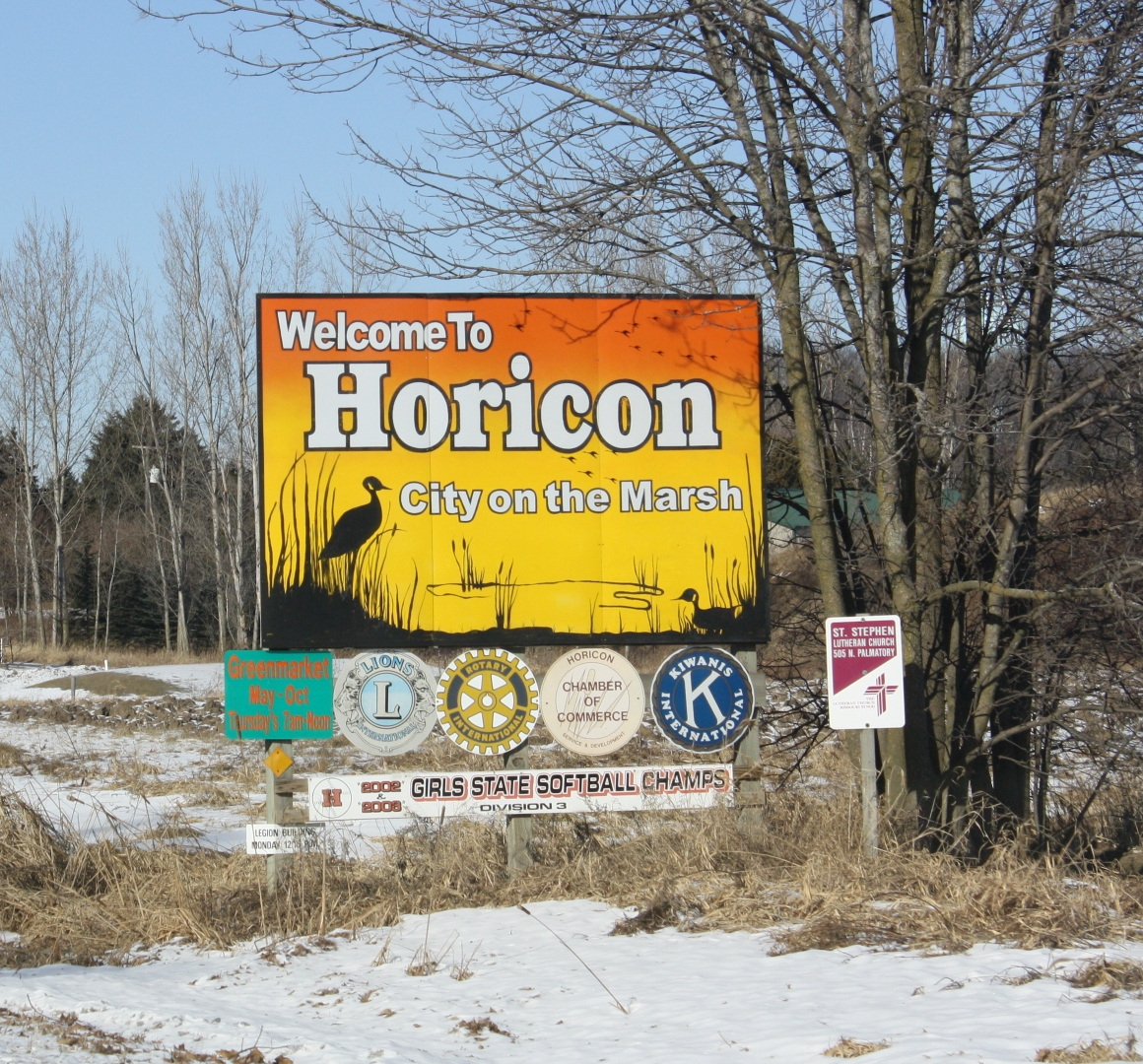
City welcome sign

Horicon is home of the John Deere Horicon Works, which produces lawn and garden tractors, golf and turf reel mowers, and utility vehicles. Daniel Van Brunt, the inventor of the grain-drill and founder of what became John Deere Horicon Works, founded Horicon Bank in 1896.

The Dodge County Pionier took over the Horicon Reporter in 2009 to cover news in Horicon and the surrounding area.

== Education ==
The School District of Horicon serves the area. It consists of Van Brunt Elementary School and Horicon High School, whose nickname is the Marshmen.

== Horicon Public Library ==
The Horicon Public Library is a member of the Mid-Wisconsin Federated Library System (MWFLS) and is in the Trio consortium, which shares materials with various other public and school libraries throughout Dodge, Jefferson, and Washington counties in southeastern Wisconsin.

The small-town evaluation program "First Impressions," a program for community assessment and improvement, in 2009, stated that the Horicon Public Library was "outstanding."

== Elected officials ==
The City of Horicon is represented by seven elected officials: a mayor and six alderpersons. The current mayor is Josh Maas. Alderpersons for district 1 are Dick Marschke and Forrest Frami. District 2 is represented by Marie Fenske and Jim Bandsma. District 3 is represented by Bryce Remy and Christine Schmitz. The council president is Bryce Remy.

== Notable people ==
- Hiram Barber, businessman and politician
- Hiram Barber, Jr, U.S. Representative from Illinois
- Satterlee Clark, Jr, member of the Wisconsin State Assembly and Wisconsin State Senator
- David A. Dornfeld, professor; manufacturing expert
- Charles Hawks, Jr., U.S. Representative
- James B. Hays, attorney, politician, and jurist in Wisconsin and the Idaho Territory
- S. H. Hays, Idaho politician
- Charles A. Kading, U.S. Representative
- Adrian Karsten, ESPN reporter
- Esther Doughty Luckhardt, member of the Wisconsin State Assembly
- William H. Markham, member of the Wisconsin State Senate
- Eric Miller, US Attorney for Vermont
- Bradley Phillips, member of the Wisconsin State Assembly
- Theodore Schroeder, lawyer and writer
- Fran Ulmer, Alaskan politician

== Images ==
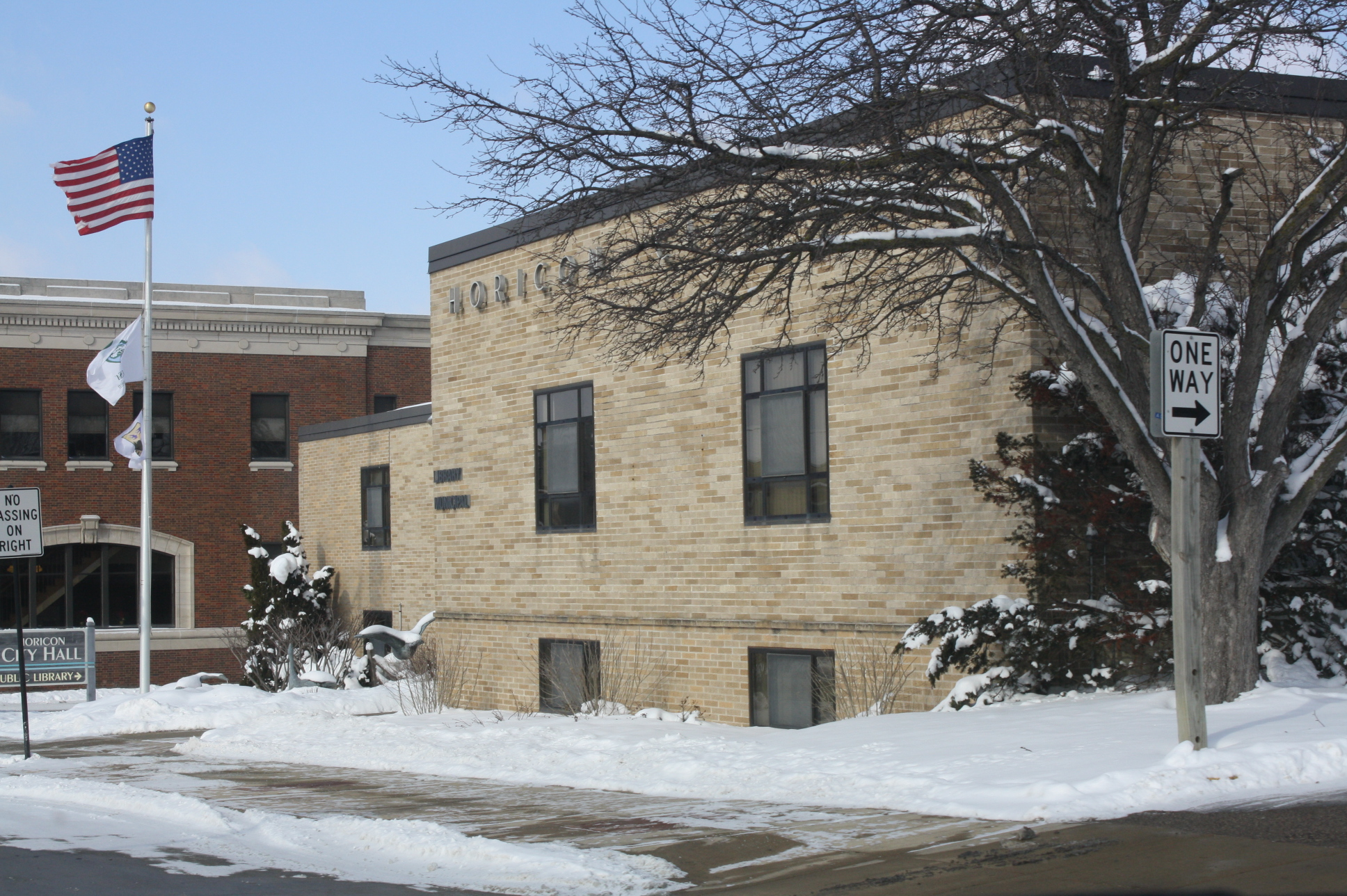
City hall

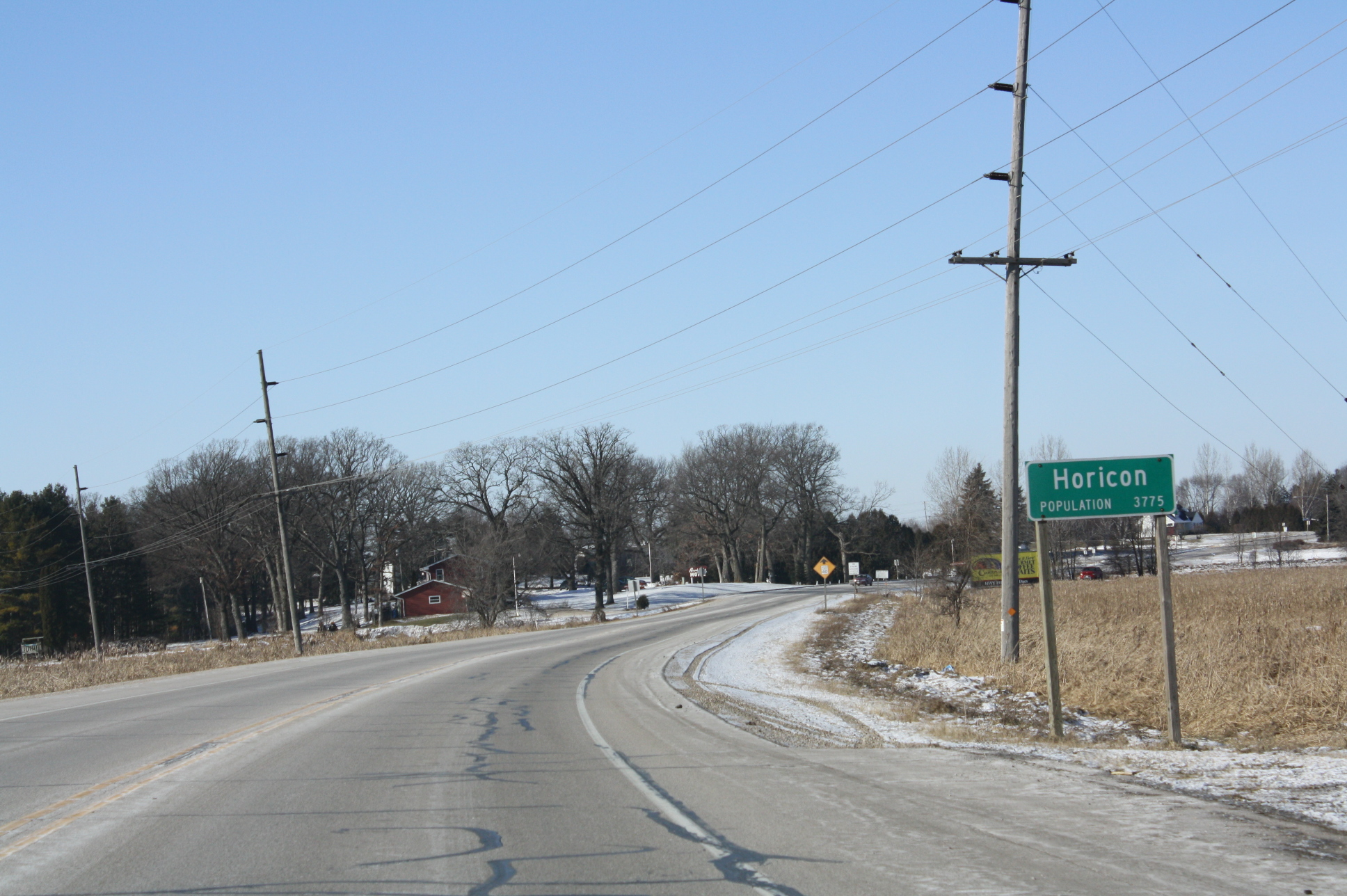
Looking west at the sign for Horicon on WIS 33

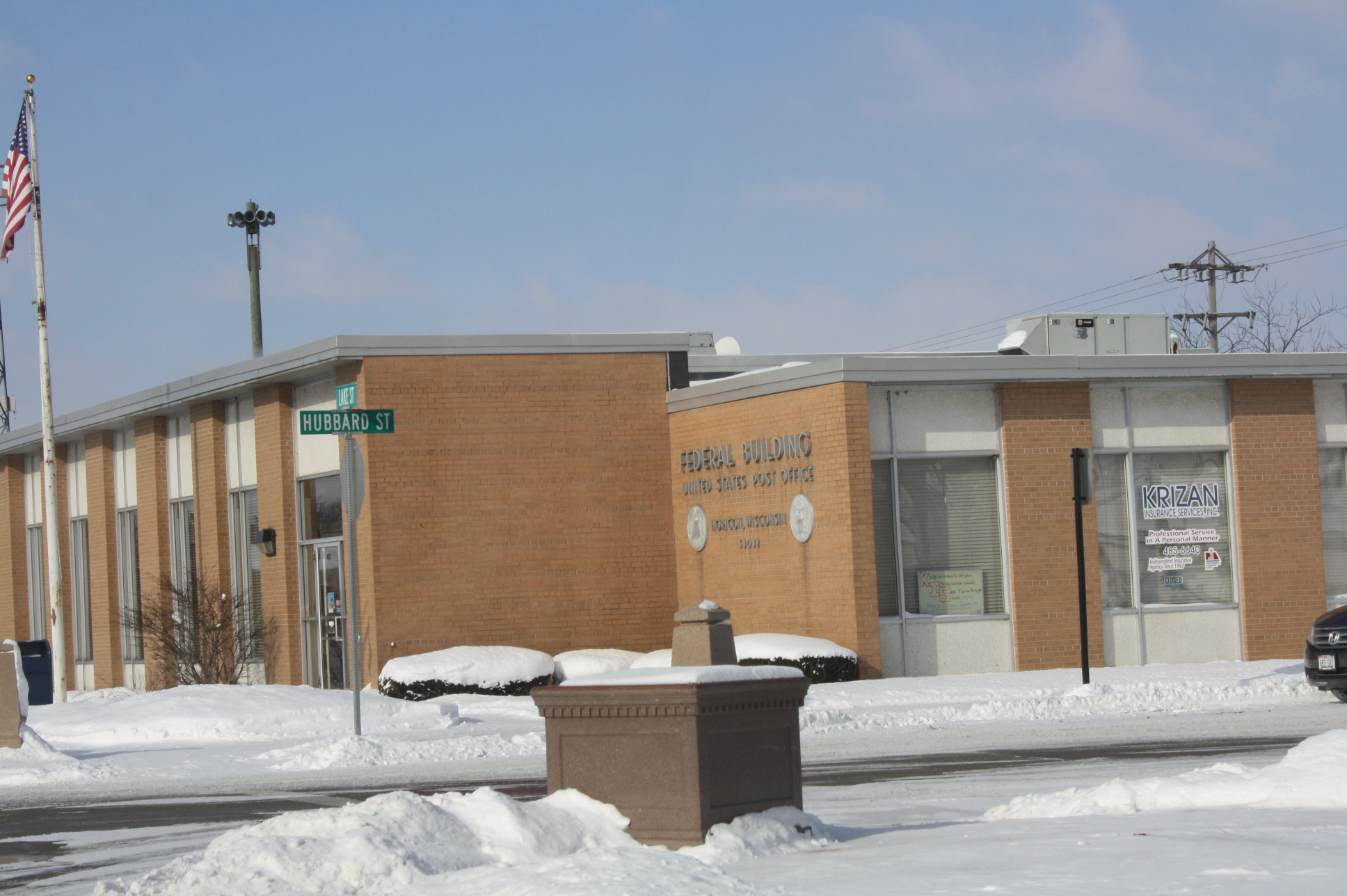
Post office

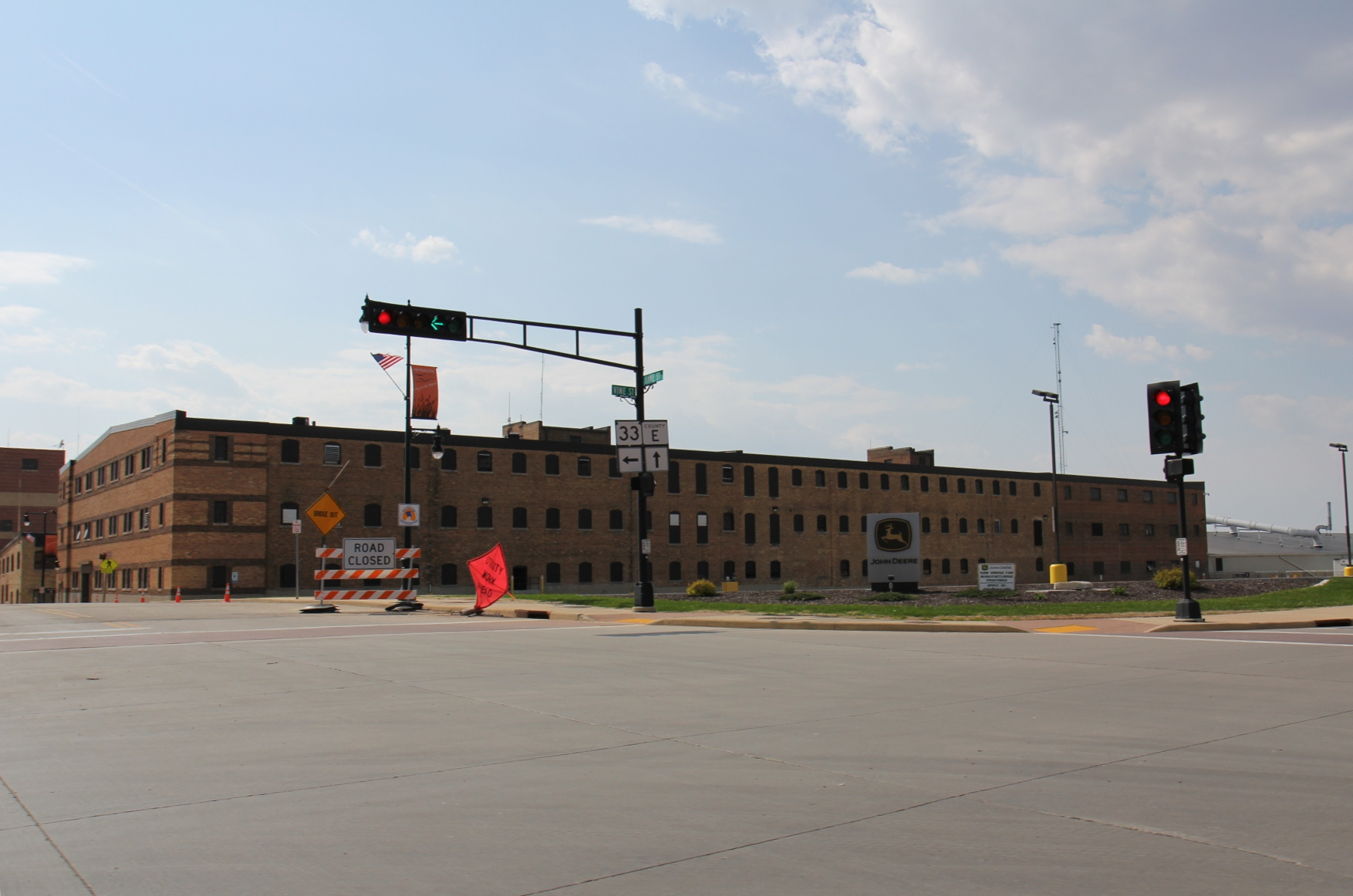
Horicon Works, a John Deere plant in Horicon

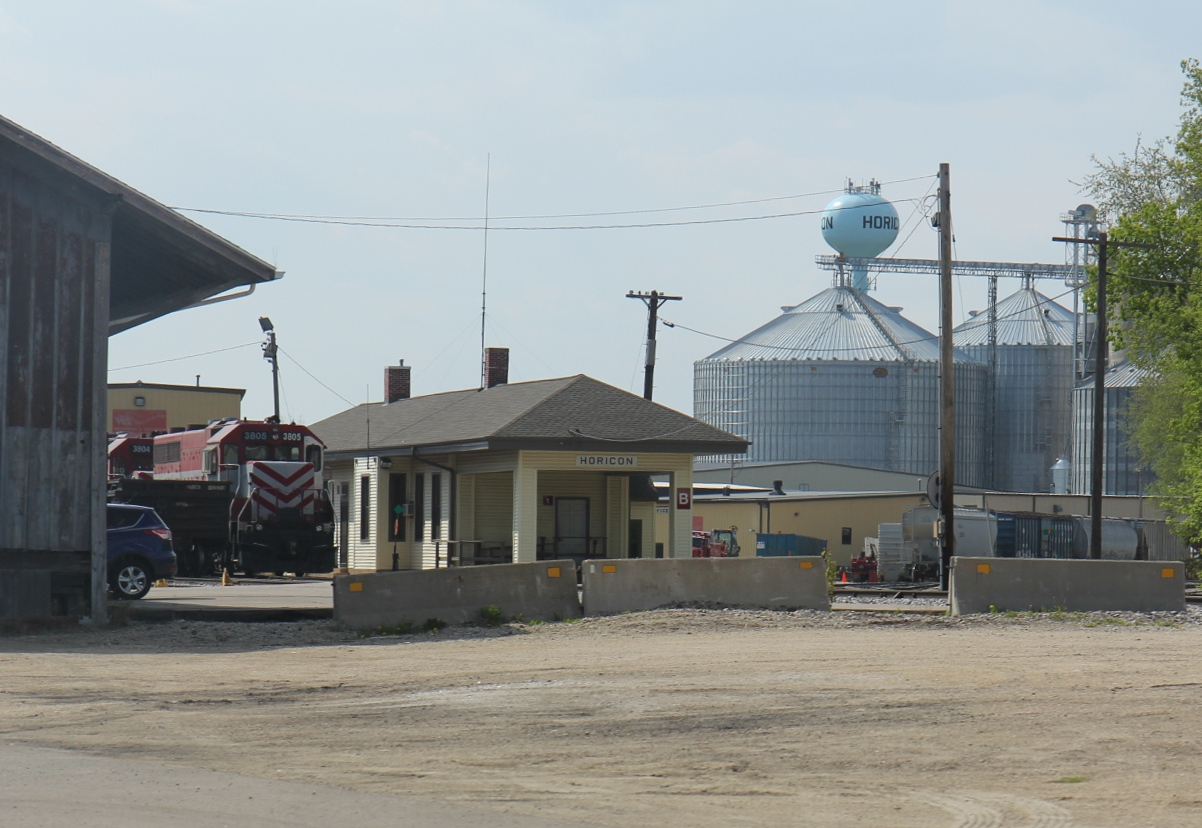
Train depot

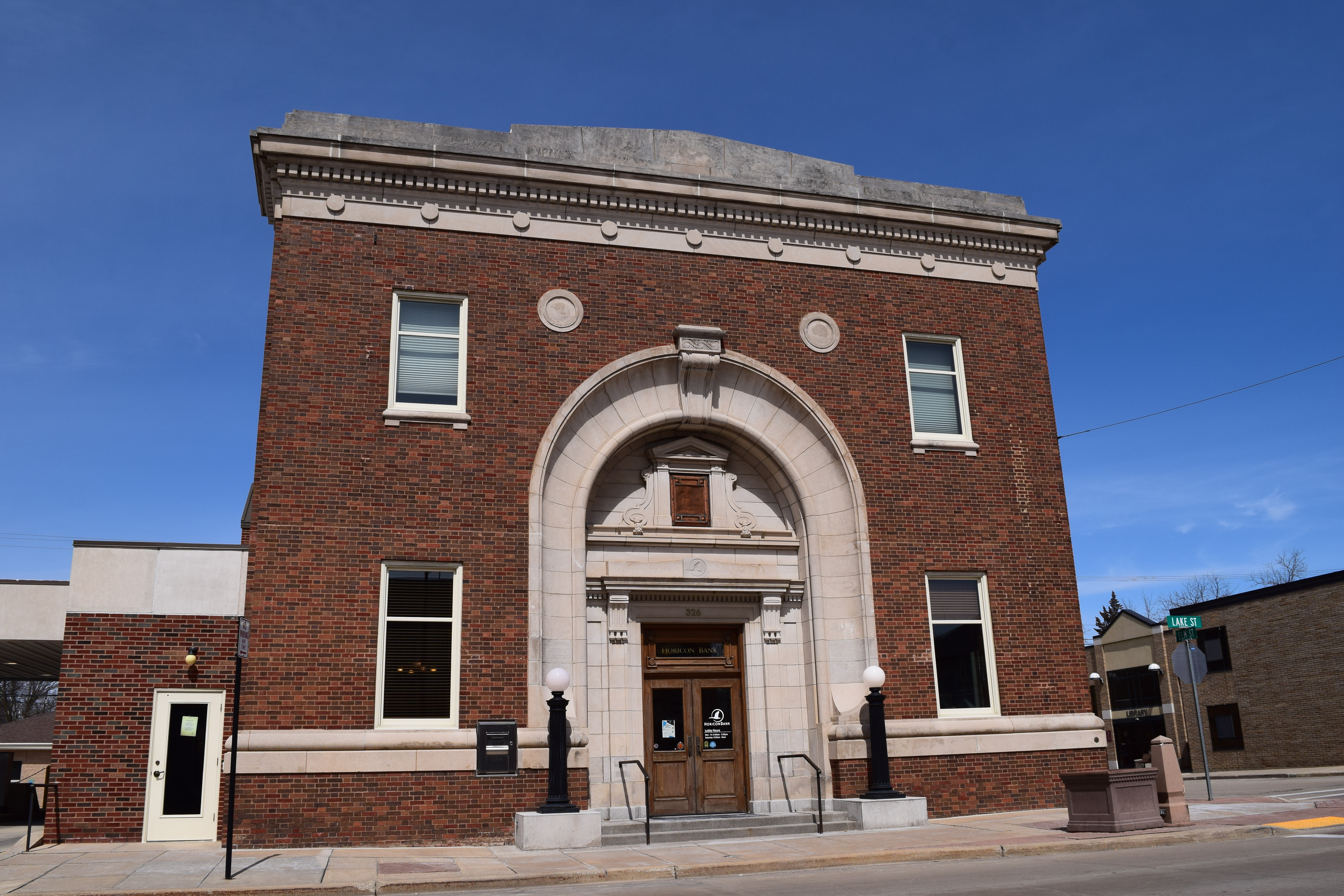
Horicon State Bank

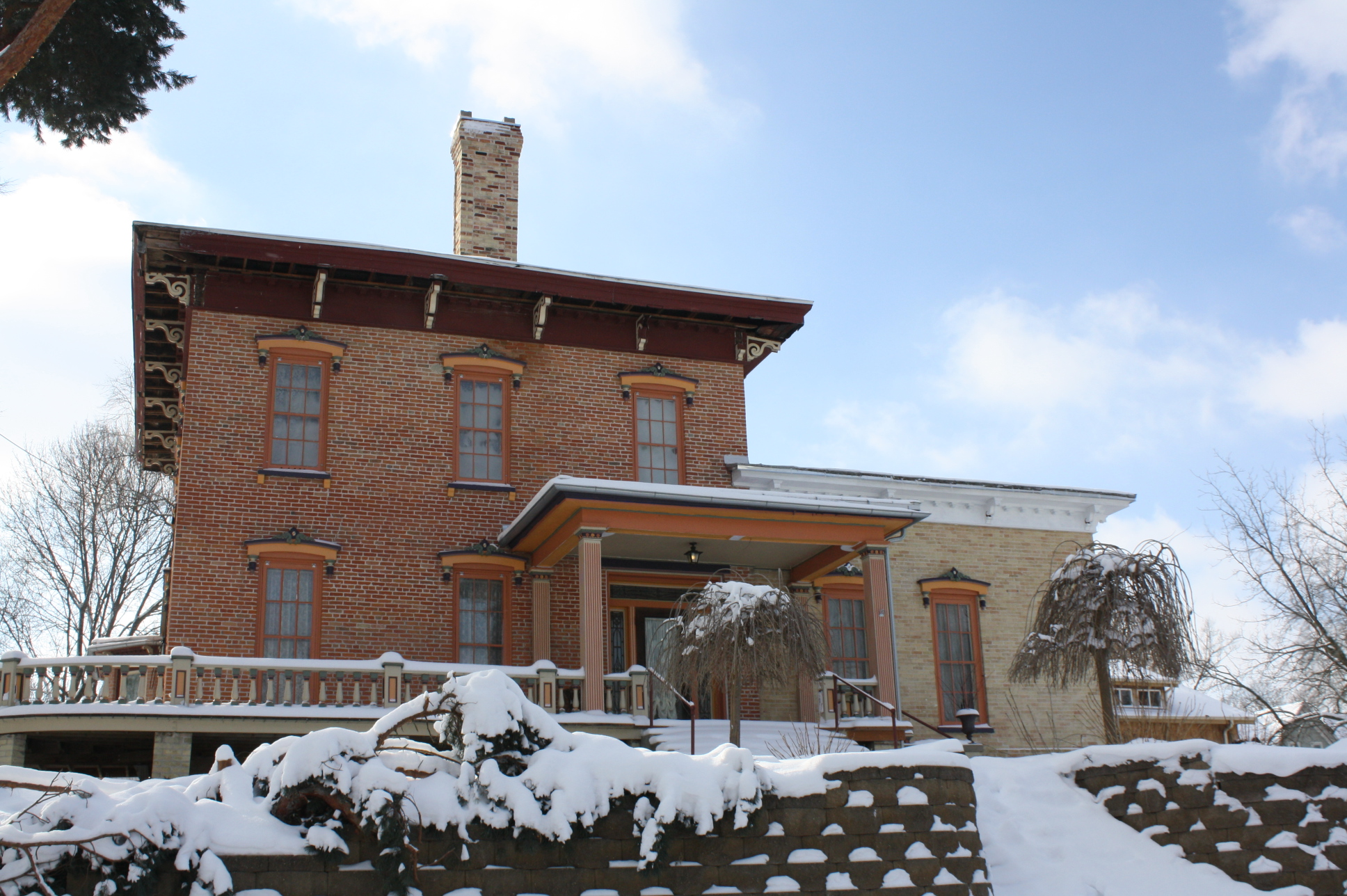
Daniel C. Van Brunt House
