= Damped machining tools =

Damped machining tools refer to a series of machining tool which are damped to suppress severe vibrations during machining process. The damping method includes both active damping method and passive damping tool.

== Mechanism ==
The active damping tools utilize a compensating force to the vibrating object in the reversed vibrating direction. Normally, piezoelectric devices are the common apparatus for researchers when developing active damping tools.

The passive damping tools can be divided into constrained layer damping tools and tuned mass dampers. The tuned mass dampers transmit the vibration energy to an extra unit on the structure and maintain the unit under focus to be stable. One typical example is the SilentTools provided by Sandvik Coromant in Sweden.

== Development ==
The technology is developed by researchers in Norway. The constrained layer damping tools usually apply high damping material in the tool end's clamping interface, at specific areas where vibration strain energy concentrates. Typical examples refer to Mircona AB's product series Zero Vibration Tooling developed by the research group led by Cornel-Mihai Nicolescu, in Royal Institute of Technology in Sweden. Lorenzo Daghini, a PhD student of Prof. Cornel-Mihai Nicolescu participated mainly in the development process and finished his PhD thesis along with the development process.

== See also ==
- Cutting tool material
- Laser beam machining
- Abrasive jet machining
- CNC machine tool monitoring by AE sensors
