= Kaiser effect (material science) =

The Kaiser effect is a phenomenon observed in geology and material science that describes a pattern of acoustic emission (AE) or seismicity in a body of rock or other material subjected to repeated cycles of mechanical stress.

In material that exhibits an initial seismic response under a certain load, the Kaiser effect describes the absence of acoustic emission or seismic events until that load is exceeded. The Kaiser effect results from discontinuities (fractures) created in material during previous steps that do not move, expand, or propagate until the former stress is exceeded.

== Background ==
The Kaiser effect is named after Joseph Kaiser, who first studied this behavior in materials in the 1950s. He discovered the phenomenon when he was studying AE response of metals, finding that the materials retain a "memory" of previously applied stresses. Kaiser found that a stressed metal sample is giving zero AE if the applied stress is less than the previously applied maximum stress. Similar effect was also found in rock samples deformed in the course of acoustic emission, particularly as a result of cyclic thermal loadings of carboniferous sandstone and mudstone samples. The Kaiser effect became useful in estimating complete stress tensors based on a capacity to determine reliably the magnitudes of the preceding normal stresses applied to the specimen in various directions.

== Observed examples of the Kaiser effect ==
=== Borehole seismicity ===
Induced seismicity associated with fluid pumping in boreholes and wells often exhibits the Kaiser effect, whereby seismicity may be observed shortly following an initial fluid injection, but further seismicity is limited if the fluid flow remains at a constant pressure. If the fluid pressure at the injection site is later increased, renewed seismicity may be observed due to the greater ease of fracturing caused by higher pore fluid pressure in the rock.

=== Volcanic systems ===
The Kaiser effect has also been observed in relation to recharge of magma chambers below active volcanic systems.

== See also ==
- Felicity effect
