= Horicon State Bank =

- U.S. National Register of Historic Places
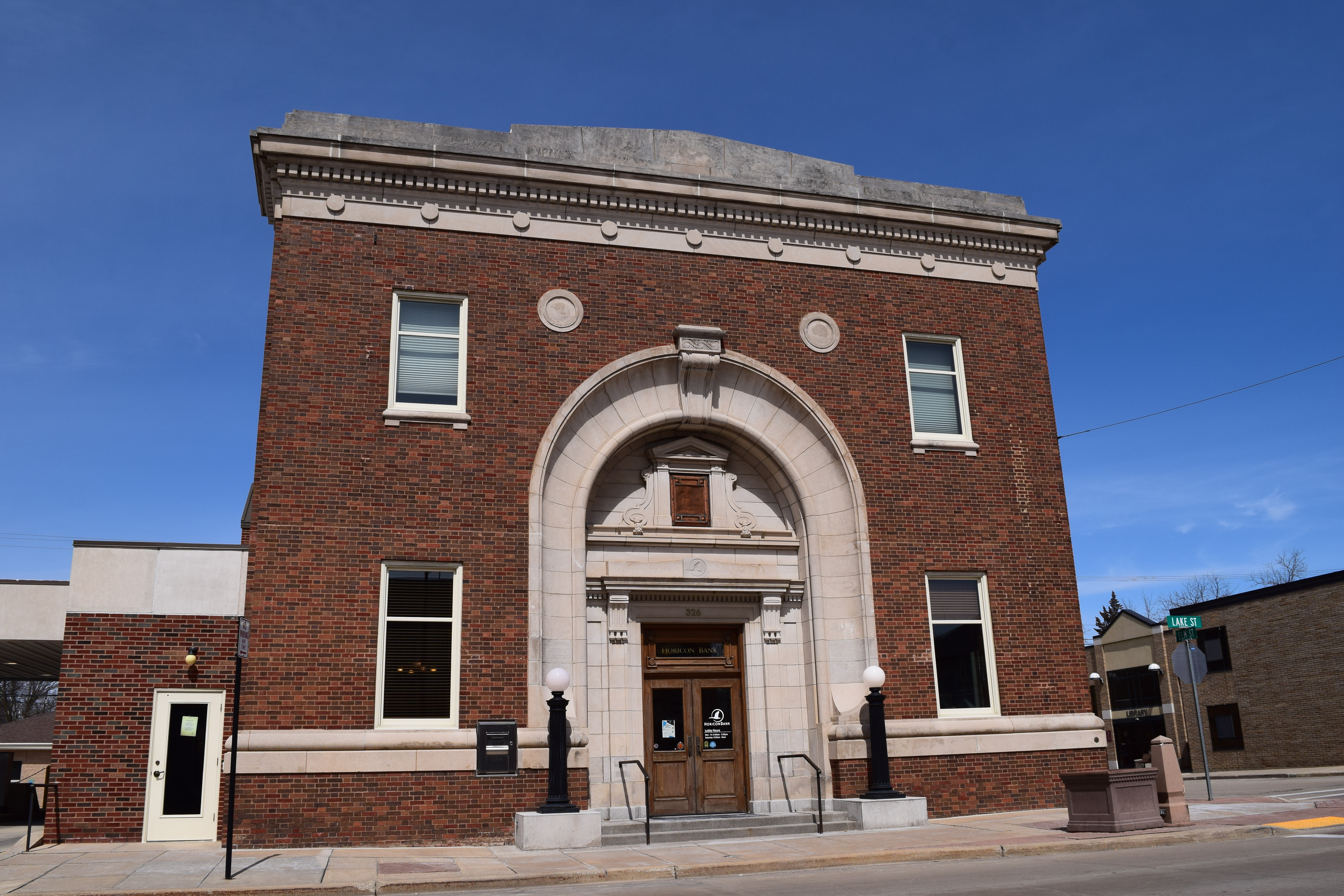
- Horicon State Bank
- Location: 326 E. Lake St. Horicon, Wisconsin
- Built: 1915
- Architect: Herman W. Buemming/J. P. Cullen
- Architectural style: Neoclassical
- NRHP reference No.: 100002090
- Added to NRHP: February 5, 2018

The Horicon State Bank is located in Horicon, Wisconsin. In 2004, the bank was renamed Horicon Bank and the building is still used as the bank's main office today.

== Description ==
The interior features terrazzo floors, a vault reinforced with Diebold doors and American Banking Company alarm bells. It was added to the State Register of Historic Places in 2017 and to the National Register of Historic Places in 2018.
