= Daniel C. Van Brunt House =

Historic house in Wisconsin, United States

- U.S. National Register of Historic Places
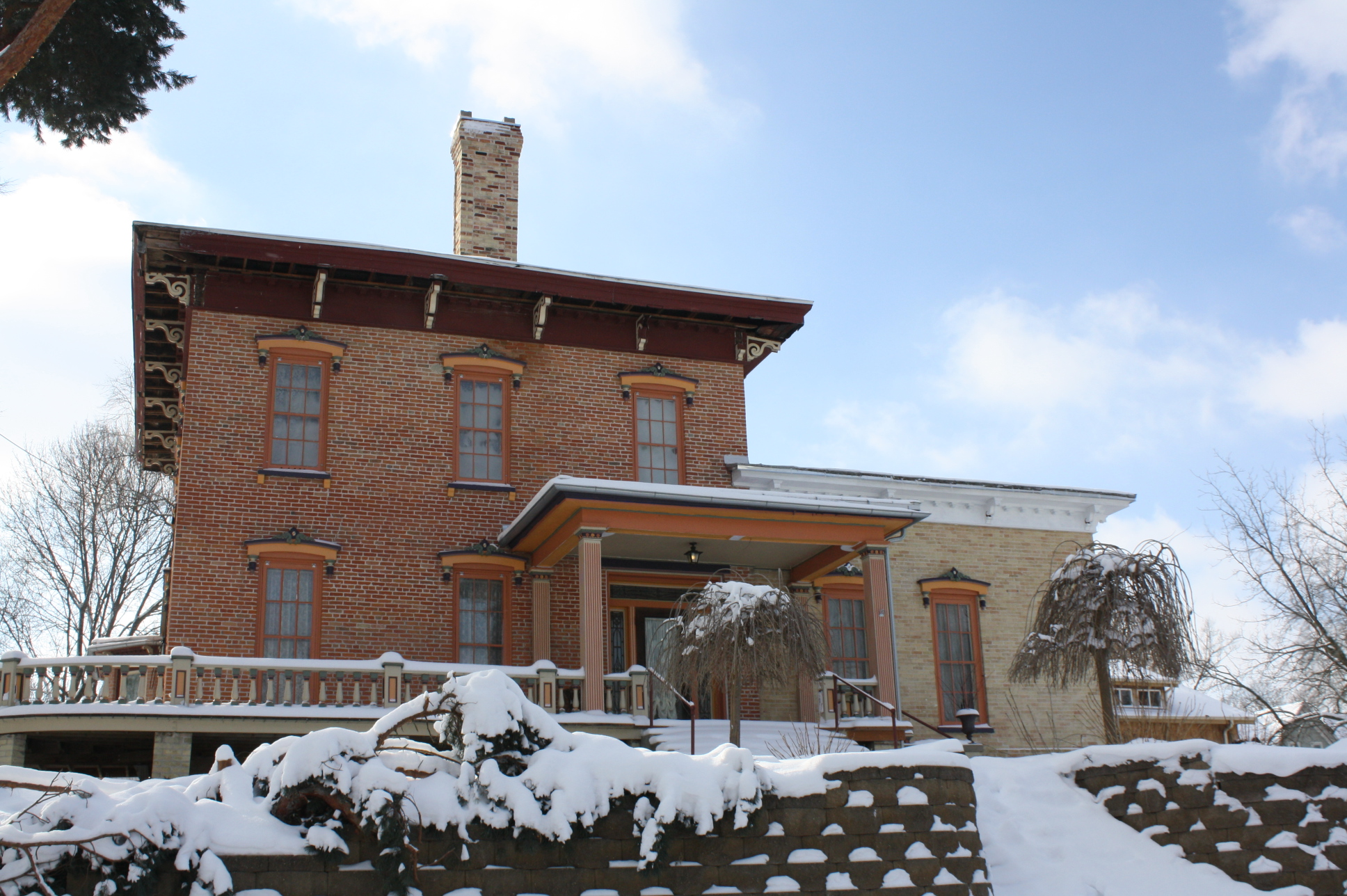
- Daniel C. Van Brunt House
- Location: 139 W. Lake St., Horicon, Wisconsin
- Coordinates: 43°27′05″N 88°38′11″W
- Area: less than one acre
- Built: 1858
- Architect: Wiseman Brothers
- Architectural style: Italianate
- NRHP reference No.: 81000040
- Added to NRHP: September 14, 1981

The Daniel C. Van Brunt House is located in Horicon, Wisconsin.

== History ==
The house was originally built for dentist William Decker, then occupied from 1868 by Van Brunt, a wagon builder who with his brother designed and built the first mechanical broadcast seeder marketed in the U.S. Later the Horicon Community Center. It was listed on the National Register of Historic Places in 1981 and the State Register of Historic Places in 1989.
