= David Alan Dornfeld =

David A. Dornfeld
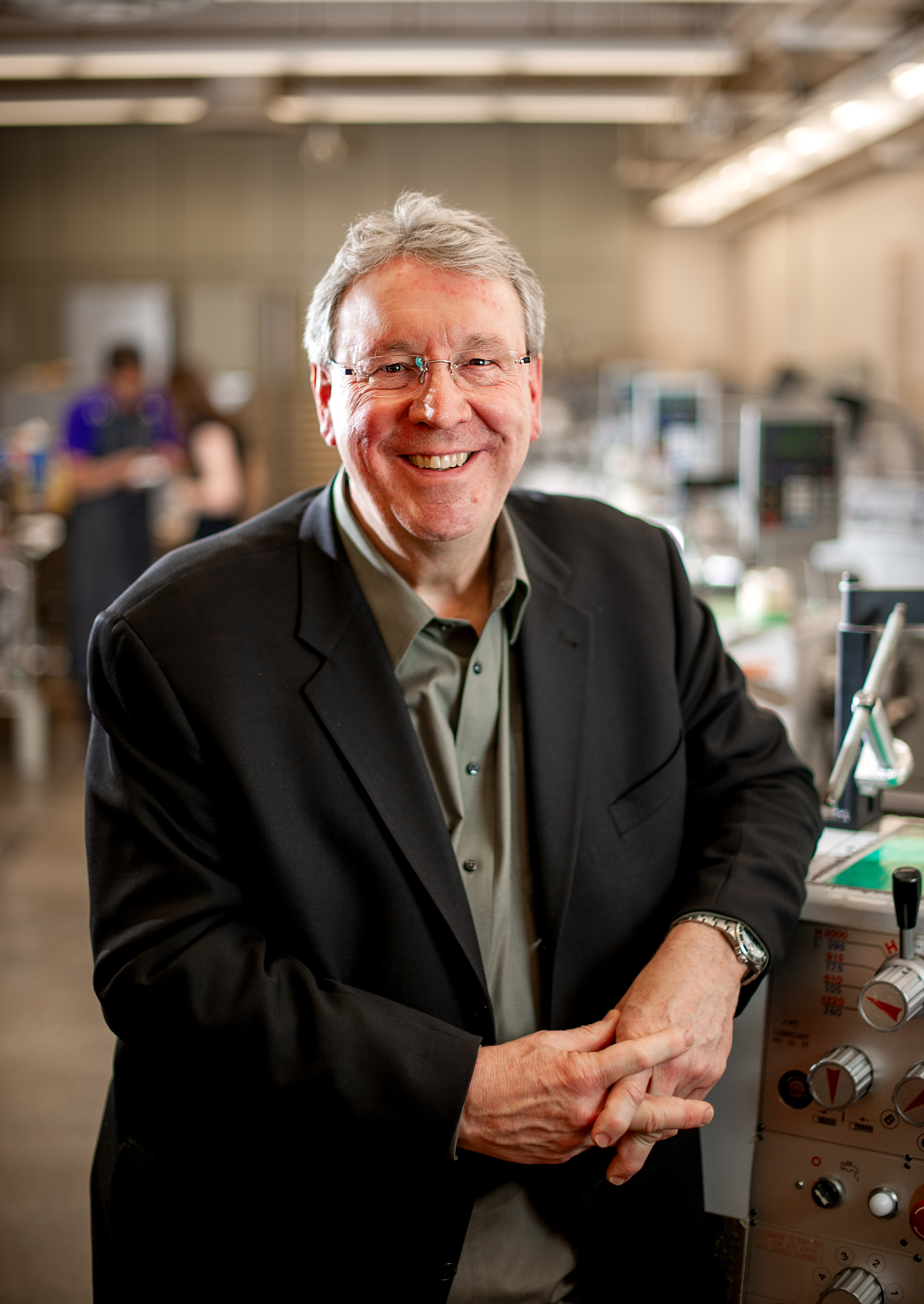
- Born: 3 August 1948; Horicon, Wisconsin
- Died: 27 March 2016 (aged 67); Georgetown, California
- Education: University of Wisconsin-Madison
- Known for: Burr formation research, Acoustic Emission in metalworking processes, Precision and Sustainable Manufacturing, including energy use in manufacturing
- Scientific career
- Fields: Manufacturing processes research
- Doctoral advisor: Shien-Ming (Sam) Wu

David Alan Dornfeld was a professor of mechanical engineering at the University of California, Berkeley, California from 1977 until his death in 2016. From 2010 until 2015, Dornfeld served as chair of the Mechanical Engineering Department. At the time of his death, he was the founding director of the campus’s Jacobs Institute for Design Innovation.

== Education ==
Dornfeld received his BS, MS, and PhD degrees in mechanical engineering from the University of Wisconsin-Madison in 1972, 1973 and 1976, respectively. His PhD dissertation, “Investigation of the Fundamentals of Mechanical Pulping”, addressed the use of abrasive machining in production engineering. He was the 29th of the 114 students to get their PhD under Professor Wu.

After a year of teaching at the University of Wisconsin-Milwaukee, in 1977 he joined the Mechanical Engineering faculty at the University of California, Berkeley. At Cal, he became the Will C. Hall Family Professor of Engineering and the Director of the Laboratory for Manufacturing and Sustainability (LMAS). He mentored 55 PhD students and consulted and advised countless other graduate students during his time at Berkeley.

== Career highlights ==
1982 - Received the SME (Society of Manufacturing Engineers) Outstanding Young Manufacturing Engineer Award.

1982 - Sabbatical: Directeur de Recherche Associe, Ecole Nationale Superieure des Mines de Paris, Paris, France.

1986 - Along with fellow professor Masayoshi Tomizuka, organized a symposium in Japan called the Japan USA Symposium on Flexible Manufacturing, which continues biannually to this day.

1989 - Recognized for his teaching, winning the Pi Tau Sigma Excellence in Teaching Award.

1989 - Dornfeld became a full professor of manufacturing engineering and was appointed the director of Berkeley’s Engineering Systems Research Center, a position he held for a decade.

1989-1990 - Co-author of four patents for applying acoustic emissions measurements in wood composites, metal and plastic: US-4831880-A, US-4854172-A, US-4922754-A, and US-4936128-A.

1990s - Began research on chemical-mechanical planarization, CMP, resulting in two patents issued in 2005-2007: US-2005215178-A1 and US-7226345-B1.

1992 - Sabbatical: Invited Professor, Ecole Nationale Superieure d'Arts et Metiers - ENSAM, Paris, France.

1993 - Began research on burr formation, establishing CODEF - the Consortium on Deburring and Edge Finishing. As the Director of CODEF 2001, he was co-author of 61 publications on burr formation, drilling, process planning and design, and micromachining. *

1999 - Named the Will C. Hall Family Professor of Engineering.

2000 - Founded the Laboratory for Manufacturing and Sustainability, LMAS, with main lab groups being Precision Manufacturing, Green Engineering, and SMP (the Sustainable Manufacturing Partnership). The LMAS produced 228 publications between 2001 and 2014.

2001-2008 - Served as the College of Engineering's Associate Dean of Interdisciplinary Studies.

2005 - Appointed the Special Division Deputy for the Engineering Division at the Lawrence Berkeley National Lab.

2007 - Began the Green Manufacturing blog, with 128 entries of commentary, information and resources related to green manufacturing, sustainable manufacturing and sustainability in the US and abroad.

2010 - 2015 Served as Chair of the UC-Berkeley Mechanical Engineering Department.

2015 - Founding faculty director of the Jacobs Institute for Design Innovation at UC-Berkeley College of Engineering.

2018 - One final patent, US-2018326550-A1, issued: "Acoustic and vibration sensing apparatus and method for monitoring cutting tool operation."

== Awards and recognition ==
Fellow of the American Society of Mechanical Engineers (ASME), receiving ASME’s Blackall Machine Tool and Gage Award in 1986, the Ennor Award in 2010, and the M. Eugene Merchant Manufacturing Medal in 2015.

Fellow and past director of the Society of Manufacturing Engineers (SME) and in 2004, was awarded SME’s Frederick W. Taylor Research Medal.

Fellow and Vice President of the International Academy for Production Engineering (CIRP) in August 2015.

Fellow of the University of Tokyo School of Engineering.

Member of the Japan Society of Precision Engineering (JSPE) and recipient of the JSPE Takagi Prize in 2005.

Recipient of the Charles F. Carter Advancing Manufacturing Award of the Association for Manufacturing Technology.

In 2013, he was elected to the National Academy of Engineering.

In 2017, the Society of Manufacturing Engineers established the NAMRI | SME Dornfeld Manufacturing Vision Award in David's honor. The aim of the "Blue Sky Competition" at NAMRC is to identify long-term challenges and new visionary ideas for manufacturing to influence the future of manufacturing research and education in the U.S. The award recognizes outstanding vision and leadership within the manufacturing community.

== * Significance of Burr Research ==
In his paper on the history of burr technology development, burr expert LaRoux K. Gillespie described the work of CODEF as follows:

Page 6: "Dave Dornfeld began his Consortia on Deburring and Edge Finishing (CODEF) at Berkeley in 1993 and has become the world leader in developing burr formation mechanics. Under his leadership graduate students from around the world have developed mechanistic models of burr formation for many different conditions."

Page 7: "After extensive theoretical and empirical analysis of how burrs form, CODEF is (for milling) able to provide cutter paths and conditions which minimize burrs and put them at locations that are easier to remove. The software that supports this minimization represents yet another advance in the field of burr technology. There was no software in the 1960’s, 1970’s, 1980’s or early 1990’s. Dornfeld’s group developed it and the companies supporting CODEF put it to production floor use."

== Tributes ==
"Remembering David Dornfeld," Jacobs Design Conversation by Bjoern Hartmann, CTO of Jacobs Institute for Design Innovation, Apr 6, 2016.

"Tribute to Prof. David A. Dornfeld - MINLAB - UW-Madison"

ASME video from the Merchant Medal, Published Mar 29, 2016

The David A. Dornfeld Graduate Fellowship fund at UC-Berkeley has been established in his memory to support high-achieving graduate students in the Department of Mechanical Engineering. In addition, for undergraduate students there is the David A Dornfeld Fellowship for Manufacturing Engineering that can be supported via this reference.
