= Horicon Public Library =

Public library in Wisconsin

Coordinates: 43.4518°N 88.6308°W

- Location: Horicon, Wisconsin, United States
- Type: Public library
- Established: 1850

Access and use
- Population served: 5,172 (as of 2008)

Other information
- Budget: $423,896 (2008)
- Website: horicon.lib.wi.us

The Horicon Public Library is located in Horicon, Wisconsin, in the United States. It was established in 1850, it serves the 4,972 Horicon residents, as well as residents from surrounding communities. The total service population in 2008 was 5,172. The library is a member of the Mid-Wisconsin Federated Library System (MWFLS) which shares materials with other public libraries throughout Dodge and Washington Counties in southeastern Wisconsin.

== History ==
In 1850, the Horicon Public Library was born at the local school. In 1869 it was relocated to the downtown area, and was housed in various business buildings. The library moved throughout the 19th century and early twentieth century, residing in spaces above furniture stores and Odd Fellows Hall. In 1874, E.M. Griswold's store and Post Office hosted the library's collection and services. The Horicon Free Library Association formed in 1899, and in 1926, the Library was provided a municipally-funded space in City Hall located on West Lake Street. When a new City Hall was built in 1957, the library moved with it, and there it resides today. In 1993 the library was moved from an upstairs location to the newly renovated former fire department space adjoining City Hall.

Public funding of the library has grown with the collection and needs of the community. $300 was appropriated from the city's coffers in 1900. This funding was nowhere near the quantity needed, and the schools, churches, city band, theatricals and individuals and community groups raised more funds. By 1948, the city provided $1,400 of the library's annual budget, and in 2008 the City of Horicon supplied $196,645 of the $423,896 budget. Fundraising is still necessary to allow for programs at the library, with events such as auctions, raffles, and other activities allowing for the continuing programming initiative. The Friends of the Horicon Public Library were organized in 1987 specifically to raise money for programs and special items, and to provide volunteers for library events. The small-town evaluation program "First Impressions," a program for community assessment and improvement, in 2009, stated that the Horicon Public Library was “outstanding.”

== Events ==
The Horicon Public Library has offered a myriad of programs for all ages, from paranormal research presentations and teen sleepovers, to knitting classes and coffee cupping programs by local roasters. More traditional programs such as storytimes, book discussions and summer reading programs are also regularly hosted by the library.

The Horicon Public Library hosted a program with famous librarian Nancy Pearl in 2005. Pearl, best known for her books Book Lust and Book Crush, is also the librarian upon which the Librarian Action Figure is modeled. Pearl called the Horicon Public Library "gorgeous."
