= CNC machine tool monitoring by AE sensors =

A machine tool monitoring system is a flow of information and system processing in which the information selection, obtaining data, processing of information and decision making on the refined information are integrated. The aim of tool condition monitoring is to detect early the disturbances in the machining process and wear of machine tool components.

The condition of the tool has been researched extensively in the past and have focused on detection of tool wear, tool breakage and the estimation of remaining tool life. It is very important for on-line identification of tool condition in machining process for enhanced productivity, better quality of parts and lower costs for unmanned, automated manufacturing systems.

== Techniques of machine tool monitoring ==
Machine tool monitoring can be done with or without additional sensors. Using additional sensors, monitoring can be done by measuring:

- the cutting force (with a multi-channel table dynamometer or rotating dynamometer)
- vibration amplitude using multi-channel accelerometers
- audible sound from the machining process
- high-frequency sound or acoustic emission

Sensor-less machine tool monitoring is done by measuring internal drive signals such as:

- feed motor current
- spindle motor current
- spindle power

Combined measuring of multiple quantities is also possible.

== Acoustic emission sensor ==
Machine tool monitoring is explained with Acoustic Emission (AE) sensors. An AE sensor is commonly defined as the sound emitted as an elastic wave by a solid when it is deformed or struck, caused by the rapid release of localized stress energy. Therefore, it is an occurrence phenomenon which releases elastic energy into the material, which then propagates as an elastic wave. The detection frequency range of acoustic emission is from 1 kHz to 1 MHz.

Rapid stress-releasing events generate a spectrum of stress waves starting at 0 Hz and typically falling off at several MHz. AE can be related to an irreversible release of energy. It can also be generated from sources not involving material failure including friction, cavitation and impact. The three major applications of AE sensors phenomena are: a) Source location - determine the locations of occurrence of an event b) Material mechanical performance - evaluate and characterize materials/structures; and c Health monitoring – monitors the safety operation.

=== How an AE sensor monitors machine tool ===
An AE sensor works on the principle of measuring the high-frequency energy signals produced during cutting process. It also measures the AE energy resulting from the fracture when a tool breaks. It is best suited to applications where the level of background AE signal is low compared to the sound of tool breakage. This makes the AE sensor ideal for breakage detection of small drills and taps. It is easy to install on both new and existing machines.

An AE sensor detects force proportional monitoring signals even in machining operations, which generate very small cutting forces. In combination with true power, it increases the reliability of breakage monitoring. It is used especially with solid carbide tools, or very small tools on large machines and multi spindles. Most of the sensors have to be attached to the machine tool surface. However, there are alternative methods of AE wave transmitting. A rotating, Wireless AE sensor consists of a rotating sensor and a fixed receiver. An AE sensor can also receive the acoustic waves via a jet of cooling lubricant, which can be connected directly to the tool or workpiece.

The machine tool monitoring systems commonly use sensors for measuring cutting force components or quantities related to cutting force (power, torque, distance/displacement and strain). AE sensors are relatively easy to install in existing or new machines, and do not influence machine integrity and stiffness. All systems suppliers also use acoustic emission sensors, especially for monitoring small tools and for grinding.

All sensors used in machine tool monitoring systems are well adjusted to harsh machine tool environments. The difficulties in designing reliable machine tool monitoring can be related to the complexity of the machining process itself, which may have one or more of the following characteristics, apart from the changes of the machine tool itself.
