= Horicon Bank =

Bank in Wisconsin

- Formerly: Horicon State Bank
- Type: Private
- Industry: Financial services
- Founded: 1896; 130 years ago
- Founder: Daniel C. Van Brunt
- Headquarters: 326 E. Lake St., Horicon, WI 53032, Horicon, Wisconsin, U.S.
- Number of locations: 18
- Total assets: $1.2 Billion (2021)
- Number of employees: 210
- Parent: Sword Financial
- Website: horiconbank.com

Horicon Bank is a commercial joint bank operating in Wisconsin. It was established in 1896 by Daniel C. Van Brunt, the inventor of the grain drill. His manufacturing company was sold in 1911 to Deere & Company, which continues to operate the factory as John Deere Horicon Works, producing consumer products including lawn tractors. Horicon Bank currently has 18 branches across the state. Horicon Bank's motto is "The Natural Choice" a nod to the importance of nature as the bank's main office is located by the Horicon Marsh, the largest freshwater cattail marsh in the United States.

== History ==
=== Early Years (1896-1978) ===
Horicon Bank was founded in 1896, and its main office was constructed in 1915. It was formerly known as Horicon State Bank. Within the span of the century, the bank has opened its branches in several locations across the state. Horicon Bank became one of the first banks to open after the Great Depression in 1929. A decade later, it acquired The First National Bank of Horicon.

Robert Barney became president in 1960, but the ownership structure changed five years later when Barney and local industrialists purchased the Wilcox family's share, which at that time owned the Horicon Bank. In the upcoming years, these local industrialists served as the presidents for fixed tenures.

=== Sword Financial Formation and Consolidation of Horicon State Bank Ownership (1978-2004) ===
Horicon Bank holding company Sword Financial Corporation was established in 1978 to consolidate the bank's ownership while preserving its independence as a community bank.

=== Renaming of the Bank to "Horicon Bank" and Beyond (2004-Today) ===
In 2004, Horicon State Bank modified its name to Horicon Bank. In 2019, Horicon Bank acquired Markesan State Bank which added $130 million in assets to the bank. In 2020, Horicon Bank acquired Monotto, a financial technology company from Atlanta, GA. In 2021, the Horicon Bank announced it would be expanding into the Milwaukee market by opening 2 brand new branches. As of 2021, the Sword Corporation and the Schwertfeger family are the largest stockholders of Horicon Bank with both Fred F. Schwertfeger and Fred C. Schwertfeger serving on the Board of Directors.

== Products and services ==
Horicon Bank offers consumers and institutions a broad range of banking products and financial services to corporate and retail customers such as checking accounts, savings accounts, mortgages, personal loans, business loans, CDs, credit cards, debit cards, and trust accounts.
