= Bradley Phillips (Wisconsin minister) =

American Presbyterian minister and politician

Bradley Phillips (April 2, 1818 – November 15, 1904) was a minister of the Presbyterian Church in the United States of America and a member of the Wisconsin State Assembly.

== Biography ==
Phillips was born on April 2, 1818, in Jefferson County, New York. Locations he settled in include Horicon, Wisconsin, and Chippewa Falls, Wisconsin. He died at his son's home in Minneapolis on November 15, 1904 and was buried at Lakewood Cemetery in Minneapolis.

== Assembly career ==
Phillips was a member of the Wisconsin Assembly during the 1872 session. He was a Republican.
