= Machinist calculator =

Type of electronic calculator

A machinist calculator is a hand-held calculator programmed with built-in formulas making it easy and quick for machinists to establish speeds, feeds and time without guesswork or conversion charts. Formulas may include revolutions per minute (RPM), surface feet per minute (SFM), inches per minute (IPM), feed per tooth (FPT). A cut time (CT) function takes the user, step-by-step, through a calculation to determine cycle time (execution time) for a given tool motion. Other features may include a metric-English conversion function, a stop watch/timer function and a standard math calculator.

This type of calculator is useful for machinists, programmers, inspectors, estimators, supervisors, and students.

When Handheld Machinist calculators first came to market they were complicated to use due to their small liquid-crystal displays and were fairly expensive with a price of around $70-$80. These older units were missing many features and could not be upgraded. Modern smartphone app versions have additional features.
