= Acoustic emission =

Elastic stress waves in a solid

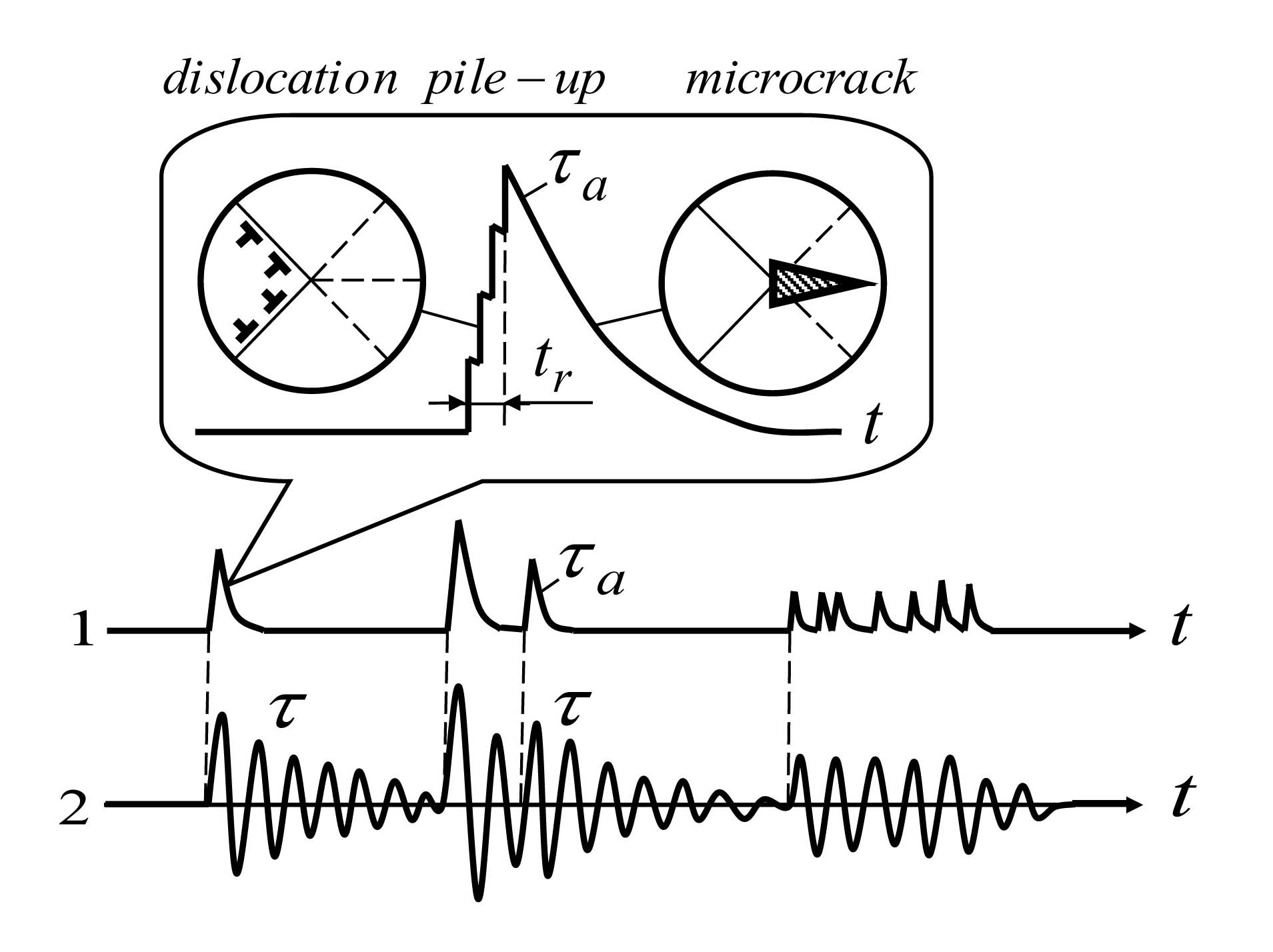
The dislocation mechanism of the AE act (event) during the nucleation of a microcrack in metals with body-centered cubic (bcc) lattice

Acoustic emission (AE) is the phenomenon of radiation of acoustic (elastic) waves in solids that occurs when a material undergoes irreversible changes in its internal structure, for example as a result of crack formation or plastic deformation due to aging, temperature gradients, or external mechanical forces.

In particular, AE occurs during the processes of mechanical loading of materials and structures accompanied by structural changes that generate local sources of elastic waves. This results in small surface displacements of a material produced by elastic or stress waves generated when the accumulated elastic energy in a material or on its surface is released rapidly.

The mechanism of emission of the primary elastic pulse AE (act or event AE) may have a different physical nature. The figure shows the mechanism of the AE act (event) during the nucleation of a microcrack due to the breakthrough of the dislocations pile-up (dislocation is a linear defect in the crystal lattice of a material) across the boundary in metals with a body-centered cubic (bcc) lattice under mechanical loading, as well as time diagrams of the stream of AE acts (events) (1) and the stream of recorded AE signals (2).

The AE method makes it possible to study the kinetics of processes at the earliest stages of microdeformation, dislocation nucleation and accumulation of microcracks. Roughly speaking, each crack seems to "scream" about its growth. This makes it possible to diagnose the moment of crack origin itself by the accompanying AE. In addition, for each crack that has already arisen, there is a certain critical size, depending on the properties of the material. Up to this size, the crack grows very slowly (sometimes for decades) through a huge number of small discrete jumps accompanied by AE radiation. After the crack reaches a critical size, catastrophic destruction occurs, because its further growth is already at a speed close to half the speed of sound in the material of the structure. Taking with the help of special highly sensitive equipment and measuring in the simplest case the intensity of dNa/dt (quantity per unit of time), as well as the total number of acts (events) of AE, Na, it is possible to experimentally estimate the growth rate, crack length and predict the proximity of destruction according to AE data.

The waves generated by sources of AE are of practical interest in structural health monitoring (SHM), quality control, system feedback, process monitoring, and other fields. In SHM applications, AE is typically used to detect, locate, and characterise damage.

== Phenomena ==
Acoustic emission is associated with transient elastic waves within a material, caused by the rapid release of localized stress energy. An event source is defined by the release of the elastic energy into the material, which then propagates as elastic waves. Acoustic emissions can be detected in frequency ranges under 1 kHz, and have been reported at frequencies up to 100 MHz, but most of the released energy is within the 1 kHz to 1 MHz range. Rapid stress-releasing events generate a spectrum of stress waves starting at 0 Hz, and typically falling off at several MHz.

The three major applications of AE techniques are: 1) source location – determine the locations where an event source occurred; 2) material mechanical performance – evaluate and characterize materials and structures; and 3) health monitoring – monitor the safe operation of a structure, for example, bridges, pressure containers, pipelines, etc.

More recent research has focused on using AE to not only locate but also to characterise the source mechanisms such as crack growth, friction, delamination, matrix cracking, etc. This would give AE the ability to tell the end user what source mechanism is present and allow them to determine whether structural repairs are necessary.

Employing proper signal processing and analysis allows for the possibility to gain a deeper understanding of the elastic wave signals and their relation to processes occurring within structures.

A significant expansion of the capabilities and an increase in the reliability of the AE diagnostic method is provided by the use of statistical methods for analyzing random event streams (for example, the random Poisson stream model)

The frequency domain representation of a signal obtained through Fast Fourier transform (FFT) provides information about the signal's magnitude and frequency content.

AE can be related to an irreversible release of energy. It can also be generated from sources not involving material failure, including friction, cavitation, and impact.

== Uses ==
The application of acoustic emission to nondestructive testing of materials typically takes place between 20 kHz and 1 MHz. Unlike conventional ultrasonic testing, AE tools are designed for monitoring acoustic emissions produced by the material during failure or stress, and not on the material's effect on externally generated waves. Part failure can be documented during unattended monitoring. The monitoring of the level of AE activity during multiple load cycles forms the basis for many AE safety inspection methods, that allow the parts undergoing inspection to remain in service.

The technique is used, for example, to study the formation of cracks during the welding process, as opposed to locating them after the weld has been formed with the more familiar ultrasonic testing technique.

In materials under active stress, such as some components of an airplane during flight, transducers mounted in an area can detect the formation of a crack at the moment it begins propagating. A group of transducers can be used to record signals and then locate the precise area of their origin by measuring the time for the sound to reach different transducers.

Long-term continuous monitoring for acoustic emissions is valuable for detecting cracks forming in pressure vessels and pipelines transporting liquids under high pressures. Standards for the use of acoustic emission for nondestructive testing of pressure vessels have been developed by the ASME, ISO, and the European Community.

This technique is used for estimation of corrosion in reinforced concrete structures.

Currently, the AE method is actively used in the tasks of monitoring and diagnostics of objects of nuclear power engineering, aviation, rocket and space technology, railway transport, historical artifacts (for example, the Tsar Bell in the Moscow Kremlin), as well as other products and objects of responsible purpose.

AE sensing can potentially be utilised to monitor the state of health of lithium-ion batteries, particularly in the detection and characterisation of parasitic mechano-electrochemical events, such as electrode electrochemical grinding, phase transitions, and gas evolution. The piezoelectric sensor is employed to receive acoustic signals released by battery materials during operation.

In addition to nondestructive testing, acoustic emission monitoring has applications in process monitoring. Applications where acoustic emission monitoring has successfully been used include detecting anomalies in fluidized beds and end points in batch granulation.

== See also ==
- Accelerometer
- Seismometer
- CNC machine tool monitoring by AE sensors

== External links and further reading ==
- History of the Latin American Working Group on Acoustic Emission
- Wolfgang Sachse, Kusuo Yamaguchi, James Roget, AEWG (Association) books.google.co.uk 100 page entries from search criteria: AE within this text (ISBN 0-8031-1389-7)
- Christian U. Grosse; Masayasu Ohtsu, eds. (2008). Acoustic Emission Testing. Springer Verlag. ISBN 978-3-642-08937-4.
- Cole, P. T. (1988). Series: The Capabilities and Limitations of NDT Part 7. Acoustic Emission (INST087). British Institute of Non-Destructive Testing. ISBN 978-0-903132-08-4.
- Development of China Acoustic Emission Research Institute
