= National Register of Historic Places listings in Dodge County, Wisconsin =

Location of Dodge County in Wisconsin

This is a list of the National Register of Historic Places listings in Dodge County, Wisconsin. It is intended to provide a comprehensive listing of entries in the National Register of Historic Places that are located in Dodge County, Wisconsin. The locations of National Register properties for which the latitude and longitude coordinates are included below may be seen in a map.

There are 40 properties and districts listed on the National Register in the county. Another two properties were once listed but have been removed.

This National Park Service list is complete through NPS recent listings posted July 10, 2026.

== Current listings ==
	Name on the Register	Image	Date listed	Location	City or town	Description
1	Beaumont Hotel	Beaumont Hotel	January 13, 1988 (#87002238)	45 Main St. 43°29′48″N 88°32′40″W	Mayville	3-story Queen Anne-style commercial block with bays covered with pressed metal and with an elaborate cornice. Designed by Henry Messmer and Son of Milwaukee and built in 1896 for Jacob Mueller, publisher of the Dodge County Pioneer, a German-language newspaper.
2	W. H. Boller Meat Market and Residence	W. H. Boller Meat Market and Residence	August 19, 1994 (#94000997)	705 S. Water St. 43°35′29″N 88°26′25″W	Lomira	2-story cream brick building, originally containing a meat market, cold store, and living quarters, built in 1913 for William Boller.
3	Central State Hospital Historic District	Central State Hospital Historic District	September 13, 1991 (#91001395)	Lincoln St. between Beaver Dam and Mason Sts. 43°37′24″N 88°44′12″W	Waupun	Hospital complex built by the state beginning in 1913 to care for the insane - especially the criminal and dangerous. The complex included a dairy, a chicken house, pig pen, smoke house, and a carpenter shop, so the inmates could contribute and experience therapeutic work.
4	Chicago, Milwaukee and St. Paul Railway Company Passenger Depot	Chicago, Milwaukee and St. Paul Railway Company Passenger Depot	July 7, 1981 (#81000039)	127 S. Spring St. 43°27′22″N 88°50′10″W	Beaver Dam	Red brick cottage-like depot of the Chicago, Milwaukee, St. Paul and Pacific Railroad designed by Frost & Granger and built in 1900. Previously listed as "Dodge County Historical Museum".
5	Martin K. Dahl House	Martin K. Dahl House	September 11, 1975 (#75000062)	314 Beaver Dam St. 43°37′46″N 88°44′43″W	Waupun	Late Second Empire-style house with typical mansard roof, designed by Newell Whiting and built in 1879. Dahl was a Norwegian immigrant blacksmith and investor in farmlands in Minnesota and Dakota, a civic leader, and the builder of the "first mansion" in Waupun, this house.
6	Fountain Inn	Fountain Inn	September 30, 2009 (#09000797)	203 Front St. 43°27′22″N 88°50′22″W	Beaver Dam	Tavern of the Binzel Brewing Co., built 1911. The owner fought neighbors and the Wisconsin Department of Natural Resources after flooding on the Beaver Dam River caused a redesign of downtown Beaver Dam but he eventually lost and the building was razed. The site was empty in July 2015.
7	Fox Lake Railroad Depot	Fox Lake Railroad Depot	May 22, 1978 (#78000093)	Cordelia St. and S. College Avenue; 43°33′40″N 88°54′31″W	Fox Lake	Small Victorian wooden depot built by the Chicago, Milwaukee, St. Paul and Pacific Railroad in 1884, with porte-cochère added in 1919. Served passengers including resort patrons until the 1950s and freight until 1970. Now a museum.
8	Willard Greenfield Farmstead	Willard Greenfield Farmstead	November 5, 1992 (#92001557)	N-7436 WI Trunk Hwy. 26, Burnett Township; 43°27′52″N 88°42′09″W	Horicon	Greek Revival-styled farmhouse built in 1862 by Greenfield, an immigrant from New York and one of the first settlers in Dodge County. Also 1891 fieldstone smokehouse, 1895 dairy barn, 1900 machine shed, 1920 poultry barn, 1920 corn crib, two concrete silos built in 1929 and 1930, and a 1935 2-hole privy.
9	Ferdinand C. Hartwig House	Ferdinand C. Hartwig House	June 17, 1982 (#82000662)	908 Country Lane; 43°12′18″N 88°44′44″W	Watertown	2-story cream brick Italianate farmhouse with cupola built by Prussian immigrant Hartwig in 1864 at the center of his grain and cattle farm. Hartwig was an early producer of Holstein-Friesians, which started many herds in the area.
10	Hollenstein Wagon and Carriage Factory	Hollenstein Wagon and Carriage Factory	July 27, 1979 (#79000070)	Bridge and German Sts. 43°29′46″N 88°32′32″W	Mayville	Cream-brick house built around 1875 attached to a factory behind, operated by Swiss immigrant John Hollenstein, who built wagons, sleighs, buggies, coaches and omnibuses. Now a museum.
11	Horicon Site	Horicon Site	January 31, 1979 (#79003492)	E of Waupun	Waupun	Prehistoric camp near the Horicon Marsh and Rock River, probably a short-term camp occupied by Woodland people around 1100 CE.
12	Horicon State Bank	Horicon State Bank	February 5, 2018 (#100002090)	326 E Lake St. 43°27′06″N 88°37′53″W	Horicon	2-story red brick bank, designed in Neoclassical style by Herman Buemming of Milwaukee and built in 1915, with terrazzo floors, electric lighting, bubblers, a double vault, and a pair of "tamper-proof" alarm bells.
13	Hotel Rogers	Hotel Rogers	March 2, 1989 (#89000120)	103 E. Maple Ave. 43°27′26″N 88°50′12″W	Beaver Dam	6-story hotel designed by Richard R. Boyd in a somewhat Georgian Revival style and built in 1927 - the last and grandest hotel in Beaver Dam - a project headed by Fred W. Rogers of Monarch Ranges.
14	John Hustis House	John Hustis House	March 10, 1983 (#83003371)	N. Ridge St. 43°20′49″N 88°36′05″W	Hustisford	Simple Greek Revival home built in 1857 by Merrit Wiltse for Hustis, the founder of Hustisford, who lived there until 1907.
15	Hutchinson Memorial Library	Hutchinson Memorial Library	November 15, 1990 (#90001705)	228 N. High St. 43°32′23″N 89°00′23″W	Randolph	Small-town library designed by Clas & Clas in Classical Moderne style and built in 1936, kick-started by a donation from Mary L. Morris.
16	Indian Point Site	Indian Point Site	September 13, 1990 (#90001459)	Address Restricted	Fox Lake	
17	Solomon and Josette Juneau House	Solomon and Josette Juneau House	August 29, 2024 (#100005282)	201 South Milwaukee St. (WI 175); 43°31′00″N 88°27′04″W	Theresa	Modest Greek Revival-style home built in 1847 by Solomon, who had been a fur trader in Milwaukee from 1818 on. He also developed the east side of Milwaukee and served as the city's first mayor. In the 1830s he started a trading post in what would become Theresa and built a sawmill and grist mill there. He built this house in 1847 and moved his family here in 1852.
18	Kekoskee Archeological District	Kekoskee Archeological District	August 16, 1994 (#94000985)	Address Restricted	Kekoskee	Several late Woodland sites on the eastern edge of Horicon Marsh, including an effigy mound in a seasonal base camp and two stockaded villages.
19	Kliese Housebarn	Kliese Housebarn	April 2, 2008 (#08000257)	N366 Co. Rd. EM; 43°12′24″N 88°40′03″W	Emmet	House and barn in one gable-roofed building, built around 1850 by Prussian immigrant Friedrich Kliese and his family. Walls are fachwerk and the house contains a black kitchen.
20	Main Street Historic District	Main Street Historic District	April 14, 1995 (#95000443)	Roughly, 103 N. Main St.-126 S. Main St. and Bridge St. from Main to School St. 43°29′43″N 88°32′40″W	Mayville	Mayville's old downtown, including the 1866 Italianate Reible building, the pre-1873 Commercial Vernacular Simonin-Wolff-Faust Building, the 1891 Classical Revival Ruedebusch Department Store, the 1897 Queen Anne Hamm building, and the 1915 Modernist First National Bank.
21	Meissner Store		November 1, 2024 (#100010954)	N887-889 State Highway 67; 43°13′27″N 88°31′12″W	Ashippun	Gustave and Conradine Meissner and her father Robert Wittig built the wooden section in 1873 as a general store with a boomtown front - the first commercial building in town. The brick wing was added as a bar in 1877 by the Binzel Brewing Company of Oconomowoc, with hotel rooms upstairs for travellers between Oconomowoc and Neosho. Other additions to the back end occurred later. In the 1930s the complex was converted to a dance hall called the Maple Inn, and that name has carried through to today's supper club.
22	Neosho Village Hall	Neosho Village Hall	September 21, 2018 (#100002976)	115 S Schuyler St. 43°18′40″N 88°31′06″W	Neosho	Seat of village government, with walls of rough-faced concrete block, cornice returns, and a square corner tower, built 1914 to 1922. Housed village offices, fire department, jail, and other community functions. Converted to a museum starting in 1989.
23	North Washington Street Historic District	North Washington Street Historic District	October 23, 2009 (#09000850)	N. Church St. generally bounded by O'Connell and N. Green St., N. Washington St. bounded by O'Connell and Elm Sts. 43°11′51″N 88°43′44″W	Watertown	Residential district with homes in various sizes and styles, unified by a lot of local cream brick. Examples include the 1849/1870 Italianate Kusel house, the 1855 simple front gable house at 423 N Church, the 1877 Second Empire Cody house, the 1894 Queen Anne Woodard house, the 1910 American Foursquare Schimmel house, the 1915 Craftsman Calhoun house, the 1929 Dutch Colonial Revival Baumann house, and the 1930 Tudor Revival Salick house.
24	Paramount Knitting Company Mill	Paramount Knitting Company Mill	February 4, 2011 (#10001229)	222 Madison St. 43°27′18″N 88°50′28″W	Beaver Dam	4-story knitting factory begun in 1883. Powered by the Beaver Dam River, it knit cotton until 1906 and hosiery from 1911 to 1934, when it closed during a strike.
25	Schoenicke Barn	Schoenicke Barn	September 19, 1979 (#79000071)	NE of Watertown on Venus Rd. 43°15′14″N 88°35′02″W	Watertown	Scheune threshing barn built in 1855 by Prussian immigrant Gottlieb Schoenicke in Prussian Colonial style. Later converted to dairy.
26	Ferdinand Schulze House	Ferdinand Schulze House	January 11, 1996 (#95001503)	N. 4262 Daley Rd. 43°20′51″N 88°35′44″W	Hustisford	Italianate cream brick house built 1872-74 by Schulze himself, a stonemason from Prussia. The basement contains barrel-vaulted cellar rooms. Also an 1870 bank barn with a frame of pegged beam and truss, and an 1870 granary.
27	St. Andrew's Church	St. Andrew's Church	January 27, 2010 (#09001295)	W3081 County Highway Y 43°34′25″N 88°33′03″W	LeRoy	Rural Catholic church designed by Anton Dohmen in Gothic Revival style and built by the largely German community in 1901, with stained glass windows by Emil Frei Art Glass of St. Louis.
28	St. Joseph's Roman Catholic Church	St. Joseph's Roman Catholic Church	July 2, 1980 (#80004480)	County Highway Q and Rich Rd. 43°14′28″N 88°47′16″W	Shields	Simple rural Catholic church designed in Country Church Gothic style by James Clancy of Hubbleton and built in 1864, a spiritual and social center of the German and Irish community.
29	St. Mark's Episcopal Church	St. Mark's Episcopal Church	November 28, 1980 (#80000132)	130 E. Maple St. 43°27′29″N 88°50′05″W	Beaver Dam	Carpenter Gothic-styled church built in 1858 by Episcopal congregation, with board-and-batten exterior. Moved to current site in 1865.
30	Swan House and Vita Spring Pavilion	Swan House and Vita Spring Pavilion	April 9, 1980 (#80000133)	230 Park Ave. 43°27′26″N 88°49′54″W	Beaver Dam	Queen Anne house built 1889 for homeopath Dr. George Swan. The ornate pavilion is a remnant of the Vita Spring mineral spring spa, which Swan founded in 1880.
31	Van Brunt Memorial School	Van Brunt Memorial School	February 24, 2020 (#100004987)	611 Mill St. 43°27′01″N 88°37′41″W	Horicon	School building designed by Parkinson & Dockendorff in Collegiate Gothic style and built in 1922.
32	Daniel C. Van Brunt House	Daniel C. Van Brunt House	September 14, 1981 (#81000040)	139 W. Lake St. 43°27′05″N 88°38′11″W	Horicon	Italianate house with a well tower which was once topped by a windmill. Built in 1858 for dentist William Decker, then occupied from 1868 by Van Brunt, a wagon builder who with his brother designed and built the first mechanical broadcast seeder marketed in the U.S. Later the Horicon Community Center.
33	Waupun Commercial Historic District	Waupun Commercial Historic District	September 30, 2019 (#100004468)	Roughly bounded by E. Franklin St., Carrington St., E. Jefferson St., and Forest St. 43°38′00″N 88°43′47″W	Waupun	Part of Waupun's old downtown, including the 1868 Italianate-styled Opera House, the 1868 Italianate Odd Fellows Hall, and the 1892 Queen Anne-styled Carrington Harness/Starr Saloon.
34	Waupun Public Library	Waupun Public Library	September 4, 1979 (#79000072)	22 S. Madison St. 43°37′57″N 88°43′48″W	Waupun	Carnegie library designed with Gothic and Tudor Revival influences by H.A. Foeller of Green Bay and built in 1904. Now the Waupun Heritage Museum.
35	Weyenberg Shoe Factory	Weyenberg Shoe Factory	November 22, 2000 (#00001452)	913 N. Spring St. 43°27′53″N 88°49′55″W	Beaver Dam	Intact four-story brick factory built in 1919 with many windows for natural light. Made shoes until 1994.
36	White Limestone School	White Limestone School	October 22, 1976 (#76000057)	N. Main St. between Dayton and Buchanan Sts. 43°29′54″N 88°32′46″W	Mayville	2-story Greek Revival style school, built in 1857 from limestone quarried at Waupun and expanded with portico and cupola in 1876. Served as a public school for 125 years. Now a museum.
37	Widmer's Cheese Cellars	Widmer's Cheese Cellars	August 11, 2025 (#100012094)	214 West Henni Street; 43°31′02″N 88°27′11″W	Theresa	Cheese factory complex begun in 1885 and expanded since. Operated by four generations of Widmer's since 1922, and known for its brick cheese. Possibly the last small, family-operated cheese factory in Dodge County.
38	Williams Free Library	Williams Free Library	August 7, 1974 (#74000079)	105 Park Ave. 43°27′21″N 88°50′12″W	Beaver Dam	Richardsonian Romanesque library with elaborate towers designed by Walter Holbrook and built in 1890. Now a museum.
39	Wisconsin State Prison Historic District	Wisconsin State Prison Historic District	January 22, 1992 (#91001994)	200 S. Madison St. 43°37′47″N 88°43′56″W	Waupun	Wisconsin's first state prison complex, begun shortly after statehood, designed Auburn-style with individual cells for prisoners, and built mostly with prisoner labor. Includes the 1855 1-story South Cell House, the 3-story 1855-58 Main Building, various other cell houses, the wall and guard towers, the 1894 Kitchen Addition, the 1909 Binder Twine Factory, the 1931 Auto Tags Plant, and other structures.
40	Zirbel-Hildebrandt Farmstead	Zirbel-Hildebrandt Farmstead	December 11, 2007 (#07001271)	W1328-1330 WI 33; 43°26′02″N 88°27′42″W	Herman	Farm begun by immigrants from Pomerania, including the 1868/1878 Italianate-influenced John and Wilhelmine Zirbel house and its 1870 summer kitchen, the 1870 smokehouse, the 1868/1890 threshing/dairy barn, the 1900 privy, the 1902 American Foursquare Hildebrandt house and its 1902 summer kitchen, and various farm buildings, still quite intact and still in the family.

== Former listings ==
	Name on the Register	Image	Date listed	Date removed	Location	City or town	Description
1	Dodge County Courthouse		March 9, 1982 (#82000661)	March 6, 2001	220 E. State St.	Juneau	1878 courthouse designed in High Victorian style by H.C. Koch & Co. of Milwaukee, and demolished in 1995. R.R. Boyd designed a Modernist addition which was added in 1937.
2	Sock Road Bridge	Sock Road Bridge	September 6, 1978 (#78003442)	March 4, 1982	Sock Road over the Beaver Dam River; 43°21′07″N 88°50′00″W	Lowell	Cast iron overhead truss bridge built by E. Kunert Mfg in 1893, with iron ornamentation on top. Demolished and replaced in 1980.

== See also ==
- List of National Historic Landmarks in Wisconsin
- National Register of Historic Places listings in Wisconsin
- Listings in neighboring counties: Columbia, Dane, Fond du Lac, Green Lake, Jefferson, Washington, Waukesha
