= Hotel Rogers =

- U.S. National Register of Historic Places
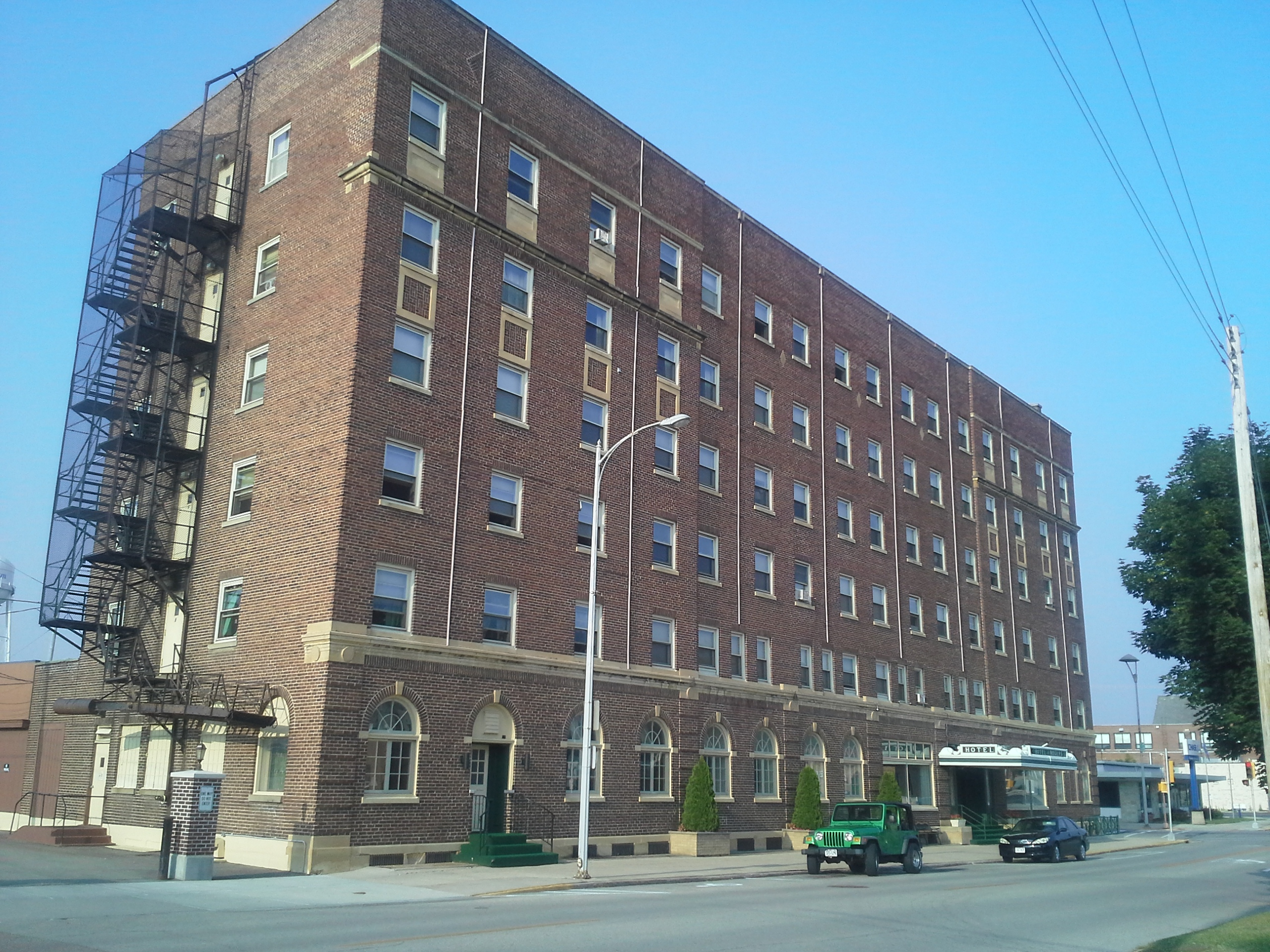

- Location within Wisconsin
- Interactive map showing the location of Hotel Rogers
- Location: 103 E Maple Ave, Beaver Dam, Wisconsin
- Coordinates: 43°27′26″N 88°50′11″W
- Built: 1927–1928
- NRHP reference No.: 89000120

Hotel Rogers is a historic structure located in Beaver Dam, Wisconsin, whose construction was headed by Fred Rogers in 1927–28. The site was formerly occupied by Roedl, Jacobs and Hall, a lumber, building materials and fuel store which was razed in 1924 to build the hotel. Rogers who was then president of the Malleable Iron Range Company, built the 6 story hotel to cater to tourists and the salesmen that frequently visited the city. Additional floor space on the sixth level was added in 1931. This building was operated as a hotel by his daughter, Ann Rogers-Pfieffer until 1987.

The facilities in the building include a large kitchen and dining room on the first level. This dining room was operated part-time as a restaurant and was available for events like meetings and banquets. Other facilities included a coffee shop, a drug store, and a barber and a beauty shop. A writing room/parlor was provided for female guests, while male guests could enjoy a bar that discreetly served patrons even during the years of prohibition.

In 1987 a business partnership purchased the building. Extensive remodeling and updating was done at that time. Some of the hotel style rooms were combined into full apartments. Reception areas were furnished with antiques and new carpet in a style similar to the originals was installed. Bronze chandeliers and sconces with Tiffany style glass shades replaced fluorescent fixtures on the main floor. The entire building was updated and upgraded to follow the original style of the building as much as possible. There are currently 41 apartments and 20 sleeping rooms.

The building was added to the National Register of Historic Places in 1989. The building is currently operated as an apartment building with monthly rates with a mix of full apartments and sleeping rooms.

Numerous claims are made regarding famous people visiting or staying at the hotel including George H. W. Bush, and President John F. Kennedy during his presidential campaign. The John F. Kennedy Presidential Library and Museum contains a transcript of a speech that he made there in 1960.

The front desk also played a supporting role in the movie, Public Enemies, filmed at area locations in 2008. The building underwent further renovations in 2018.

The current owner is Downtown Rogers, Inc. with their offices currently located in the building.

== Gallery ==
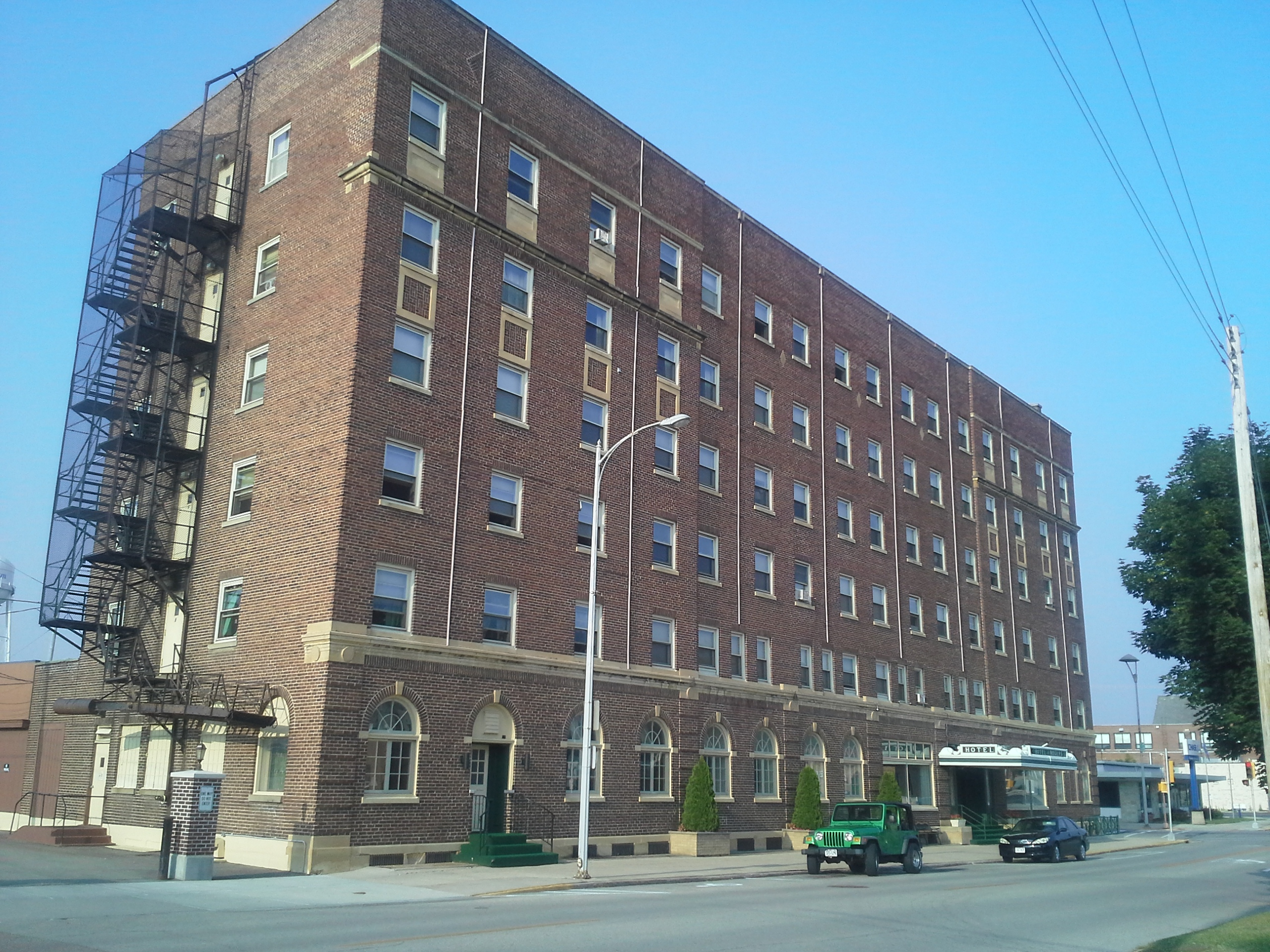
View from northeast

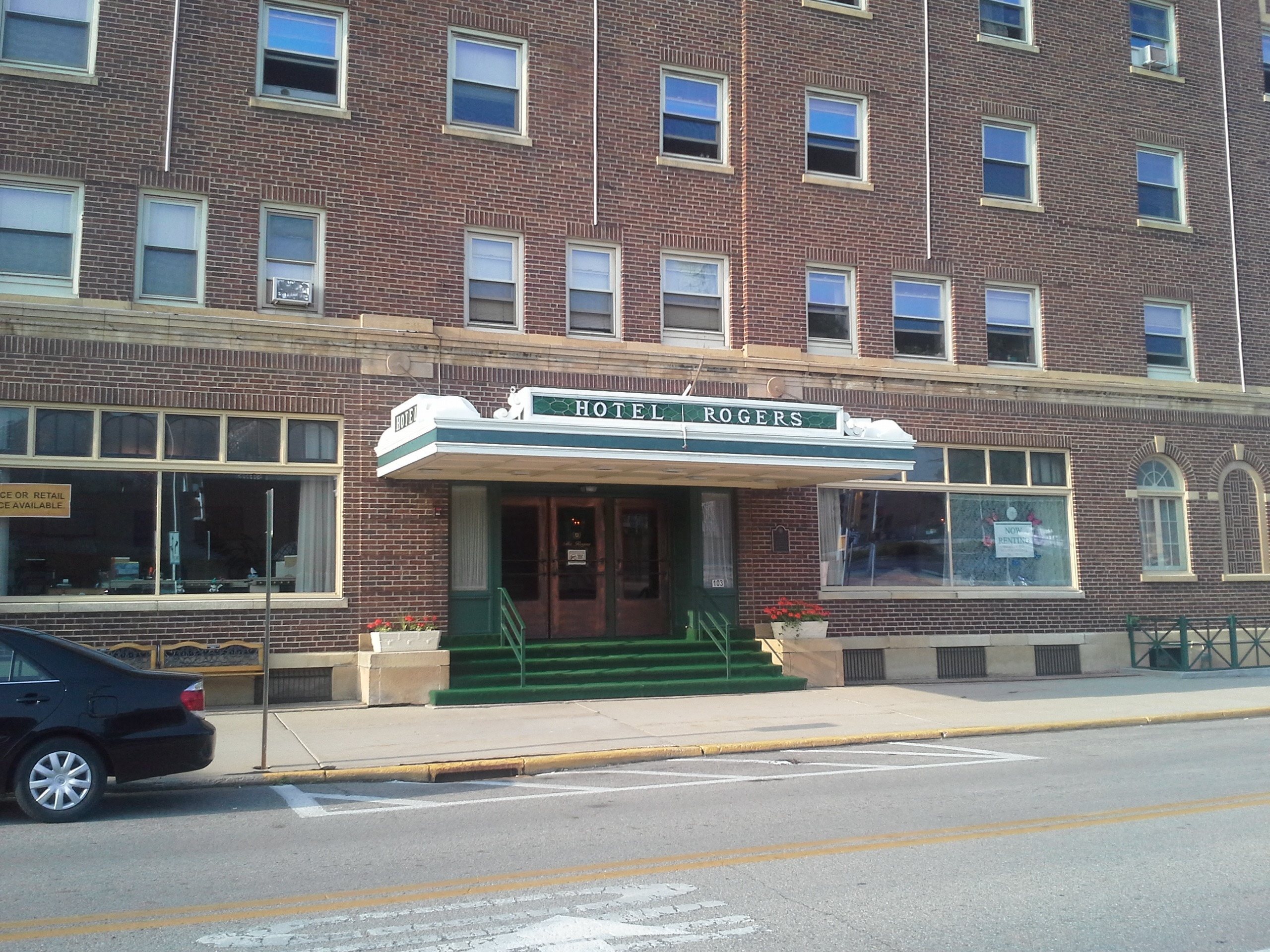
North entry
