= Rock Aqua Jays =

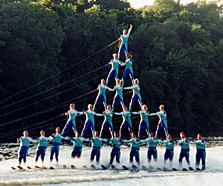
Rock Aqua Jays performing a five-high pyramid

The Rock Aqua Jays Water Ski Show Team is an amateur water ski club in Janesville, Wisconsin. The club participates in show skiing, which involves water ski acts that are choreographed to music and built around a theme that tells a story. The Rock Aqua Jays has about 150 members.

== History ==
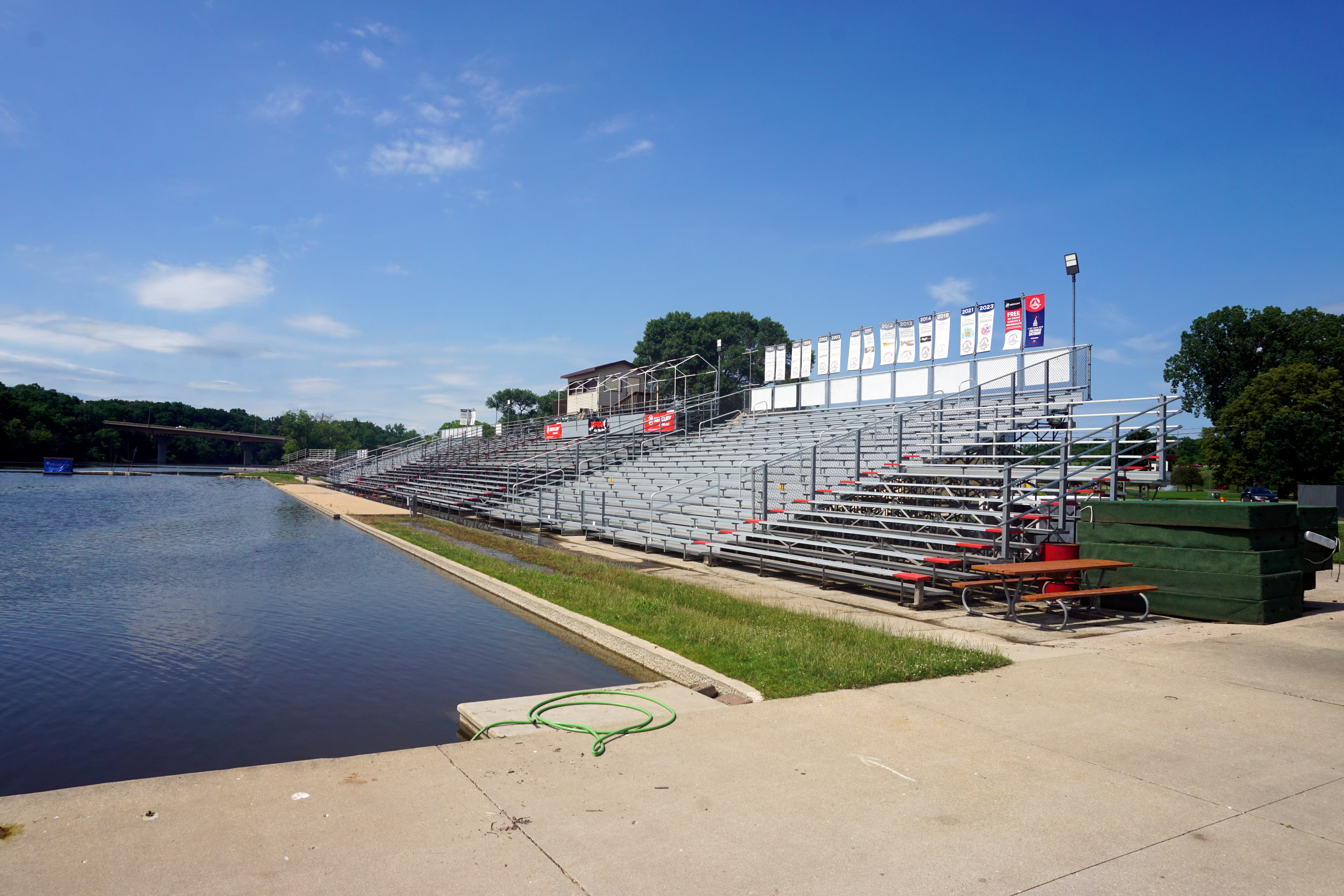
Rock Aqua Jays Stadium in Janesville, Wisconsin

The Rock Aqua Jays ski club was formed in 1960. That same year it was one of four founding member groups of the Wisconsin Water Ski Federation. In 1961, the club assumed the name "Rock Aqua Jays". The club practices on the Rock River at Traxler Park in Janesville, where they hold twice weekly shows between Memorial Day and Labor Day. The Rock Aqua Jays initiated the first national tournament of the National Show Ski Association, the Show Ski National Championships, which were held in August, 1975. In 2025, they are set to host the 50th Annual National Show Ski Championships. The Rock Aqua Jays have hosted the national tournament in Janesville over 26 of the 49 times it has been held. In 2012 they hosted the first ever World Water Ski Show Tournament, and repeated hosting in 2014.

The club was the first amateur team to build the three-high pyramid (1974), the four-high pyramid (1981), and the five-high pyramid (1993). They hold the record for the largest pyramid in competition: 44 people (2003). They were the first amateur American ski team to perform in the People's Republic of China, in 1999. In 2012, in collaboration with the Chinese Water Ski Team, the Aqua Jays set a Guinness World Record for the number of humans to water ski in a pyramid: 55. They have won the national show ski tournament a record 23 times, and placed second in the event 12 times. The Aqua Jays have also won the Wisconsin State Show Tournament a record 15 times. They have taken the triple crown of show skiing 11 times, and were named the National Show Ski Association Team of the Year 6 times.

== Honors and awards ==
Rock Aqua Jays' 44-person pyramid

- Triple Crown: 1981, 1985, 1987, 1988, 1993, 2003, 2005, 2011, 2013, 2014
- National Show Ski Association Team of the Year: 1999, 2002, 2003, 2005, 2011, 2012
- U.S. National Show Tournament: 1979, 1981, 1985, 1986, 1987, 1988, 1989, 1990, 1993, 1995, 1997, 1999, 2002, 2003, 2005, 2011, 2012, 2013, 2014
- Wisconsin State Show Tournament: 1980, 1981, 1985, 1987, 1988, 1993, 1996, 1998, 1999, 2002, 2003, 2005, 2010, 2011, 2013, 2014
- Mercury Invitational Show Tournament 1996, 1997, 1998, 1999, 2001, 2003, 2005, 2006, 2007, 2009, 2010, 2011, 2012, 2013, 2014
- Lamb's Farm Invitational Tournament: 1975, 1981, 1985, 1987, 1988, 1989, 1990, 1993, 1994, 1995, 1998
