= Hustisford School District =

School district in Wisconsin, United States

Hustisford School District is a school district headquartered in Hustisford, Wisconsin, United States.

It has two schools: John Hustis Elementary School and Hustisford Junior/Senior High School. In September 2026, the school district suspended operations as the result of a failed tax referendum. Most of the district's students now attend schools in the nearby Dodgeland School District.
