= Swan House and Vita Spring Pavilion =

Historic house in Wisconsin, United States

- U.S. National Register of Historic Places
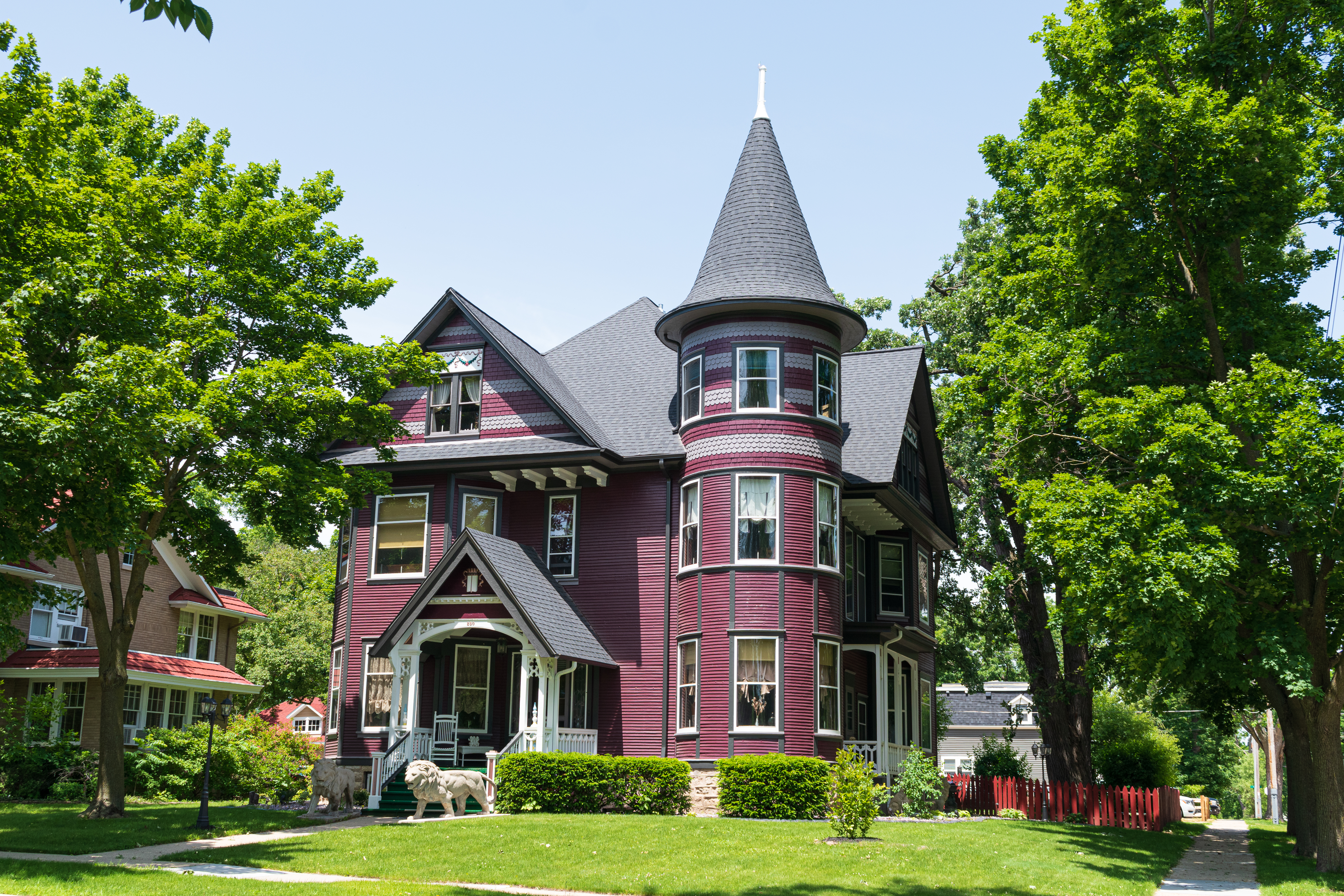
- Swan House
- Interactive map of Swan House and Vita Spring Pavilion
- Location: 230 Park Ave., Beaver Dam, Wisconsin
- Coordinates: 43°27′26″N 88°49′54″W
- Area: 0.4 acres (0.16 ha)
- Built: 1899
- Architect: Carl Shell
- Architectural style: Queen Anne
- NRHP reference No.: 80000133
- Added to NRHP: April 9, 1980

The Swan House and Vita Spring Pavilion are located in Beaver Dam, Wisconsin.

== History ==
The pavilion sits over a spring that was the focal point of a resort called Vita Park. Opened by Dr. George E. Swan, the resort drew visitors from around the country, while local residents were allowed access free of charge. In 1906, the property was bought by the city and in 1916, it became Swan Park. The former residence of Swan and his wife is located nearby.

The site was listed on the National Register of Historic Places in 1980 and on the State Register of Historic Places in 1989.

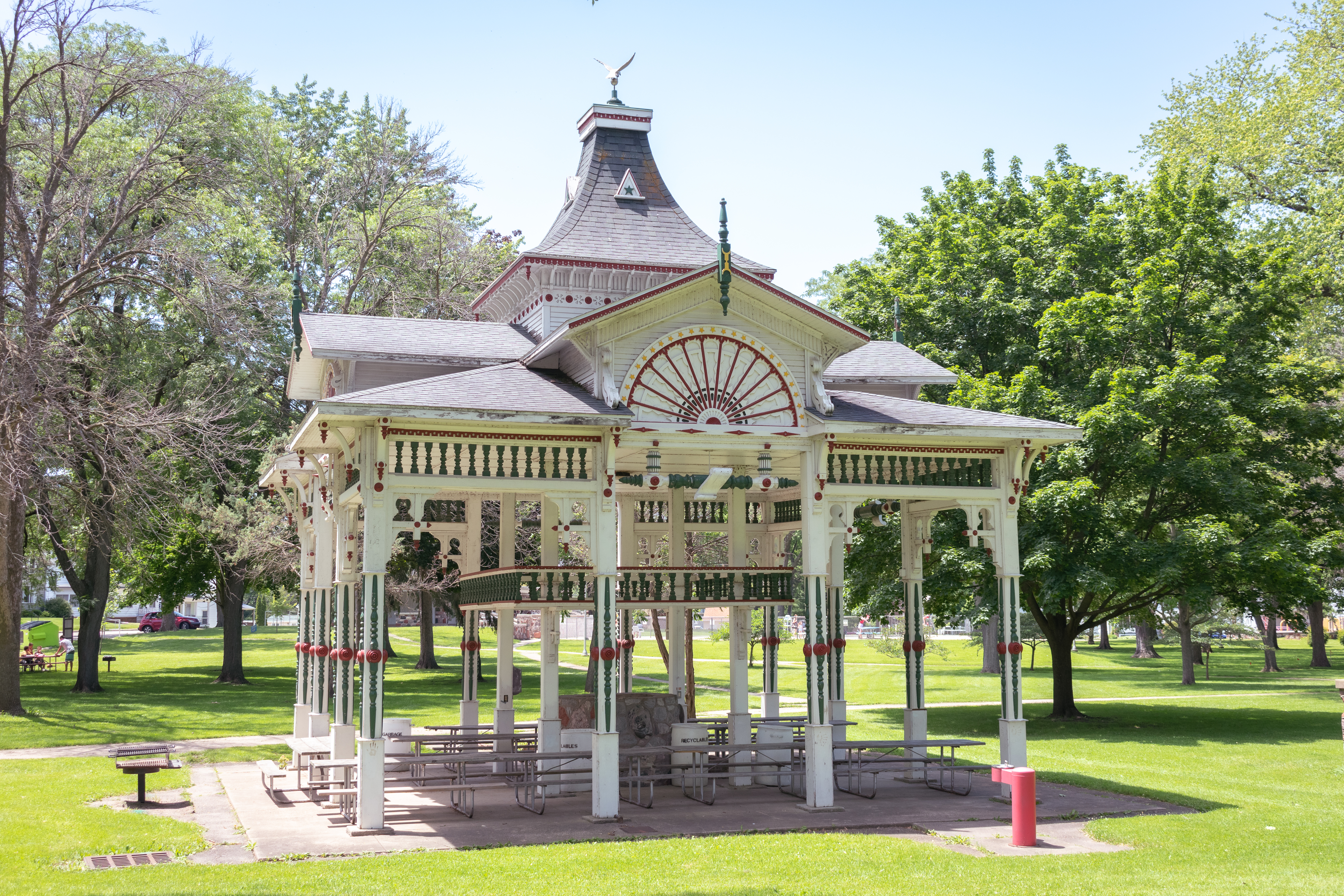
Vita Spring Pavilion
