= Rock River (Mississippi River tributary) =

Tributary of the Mississippi River in the US

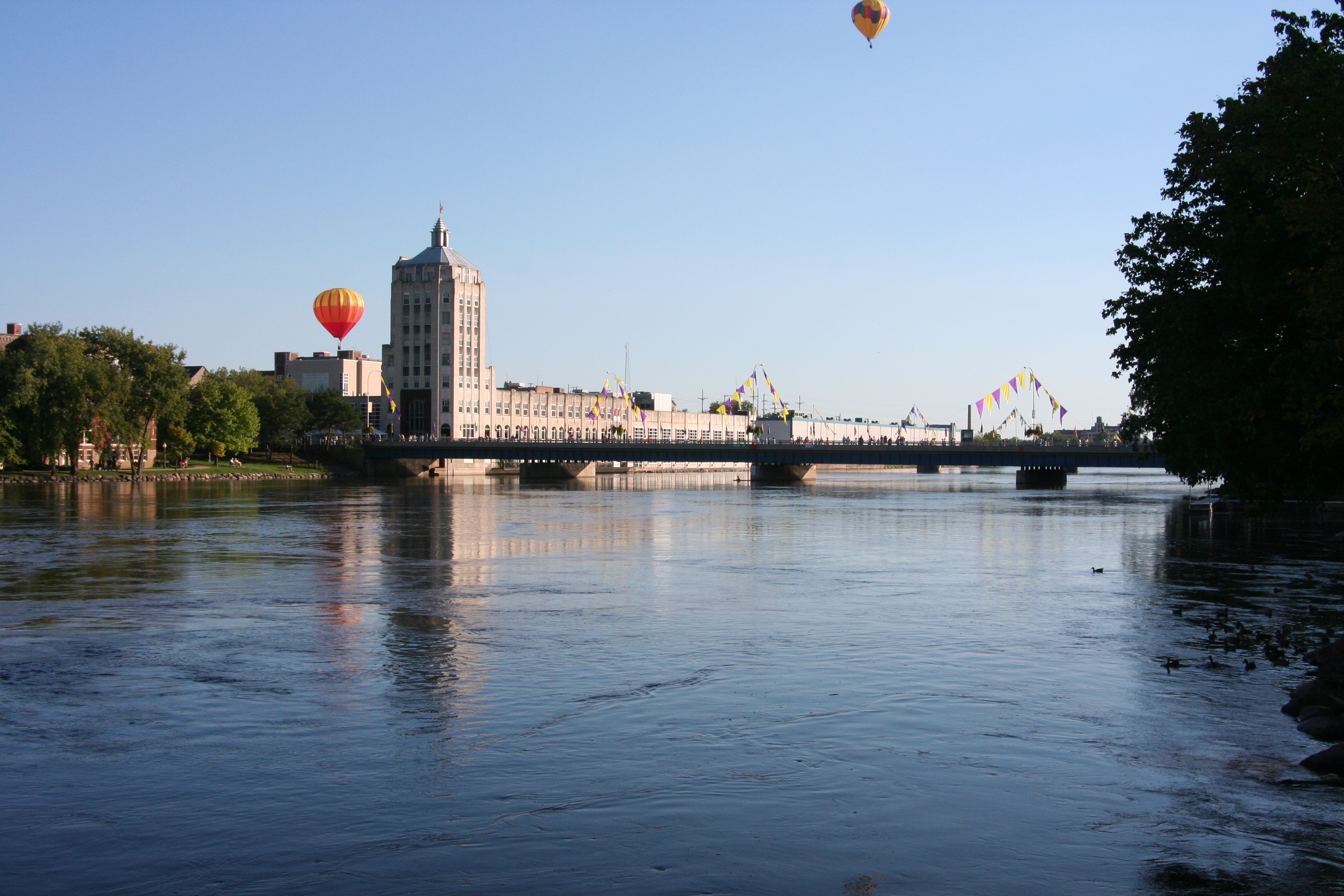
- Rock River at Rockford, Illinois

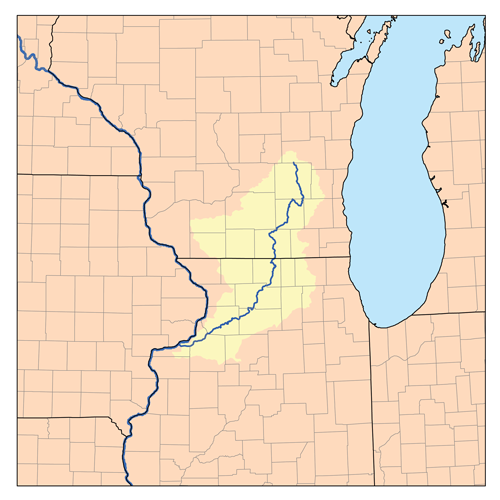
- Drainage basin of the Rock River

Location
- Country: United States
- States: Wisconsin, Illinois

Physical characteristics
- Source
  - location: Horicon Marsh north of Horicon, Wisconsin
  - coordinates: 43°28′26″N 88°38′41″W
- Mouth
  - location: Confluence with the Mississippi River at Rock Island, Illinois
  - coordinates: 41°28′57″N 90°36′58″W
  - elevation: 551 ft (168 m)
- Length: 299 mi (481 km)
- Discharge
  - location: Joslin, Illinois
  - average: 7,195 cu/ft. per sec.

Basin features
- Progression: Rock River → Mississippi → Gulf of Mexico
- GNIS ID: 416824

The Rock River is a tributary of the Mississippi River, approximately 299 miles (481 km) long, in the U.S. states of Wisconsin and Illinois. The river is known as the Sinnissippi to the Sauk and Meskwaki peoples; the name means "rocky waters".

== Course ==
The river, which has a notable higher western bank, begins with three separate branches, all in Wisconsin, that flow into the Horicon Marsh in Dodge County. The northernmost branch, the West Branch, begins just to the west of the village of Brandon in Fond du Lac County and flows east and then south to Horicon Marsh. The South Branch rises north of Fox Lake in Dodge County and flows east through Waupun to the marsh. The East Branch rises southeast of Allenton in Washington County just west of the Niagara Escarpment, and flows north and west through Theresa to the marsh.

Leaving the marsh, it meanders southward to the Illinois border, ending about 300 miles later at the Mississippi River at the Quad Cities in Illinois and Iowa. During its course, it passes through Watertown, collects the Crawfish River in Jefferson, and receives the Bark River at Fort Atkinson. Shortly before merging, the Rock and Crawfish rivers cross Interstate 94. Both rivers flood the nearby land regularly, and lanes on I-94 were temporarily closed in 2008 because of this flooding.

In northern Rock County, Wisconsin, it receives the Yahara River, and flows southward through tiny Fulton, Janesville and Beloit into northern Illinois, where it receives the Pecatonica River 5 miles (8 km) south of the state line. It flows south through Rockford, then southwest across northwestern Illinois, picking up the Kishwaukee River, passing Oregon (here, on a high bluff overlooking the river is the Eternal Indian sculpture), Dixon, Sterling (which has the Sinnissippi Mounds national historic site and local park) and Rock Falls before joining the Mississippi at Rock Island. It was on the Rock River in Dixon where Ronald Reagan was a lifeguard in his youth. Reagan's favorite fishing spot, now called "Dutch Landing" after Reagan's nickname, was just southwest of Lowell Park on the Rock River.

== River modifications ==
There are 25 dams on the Rock River. These are in Theresa (WI, 3 dams), Waupun (WI), Horicon (WI), Mayville (WI, 2 dams), Kekoskee (WI), Hustisford (WI), Watertown (WI, 2 dams), Jefferson (WI, 4 dams), Indianford (WI), Janesville (WI), Beloit (WI), Rockton (IL), Rockford Fordham (IL), Oregon (IL), Dixon (IL), Sterling / Rock Falls (IL, 2 dams), Milan (IL) and Rock Island (IL).

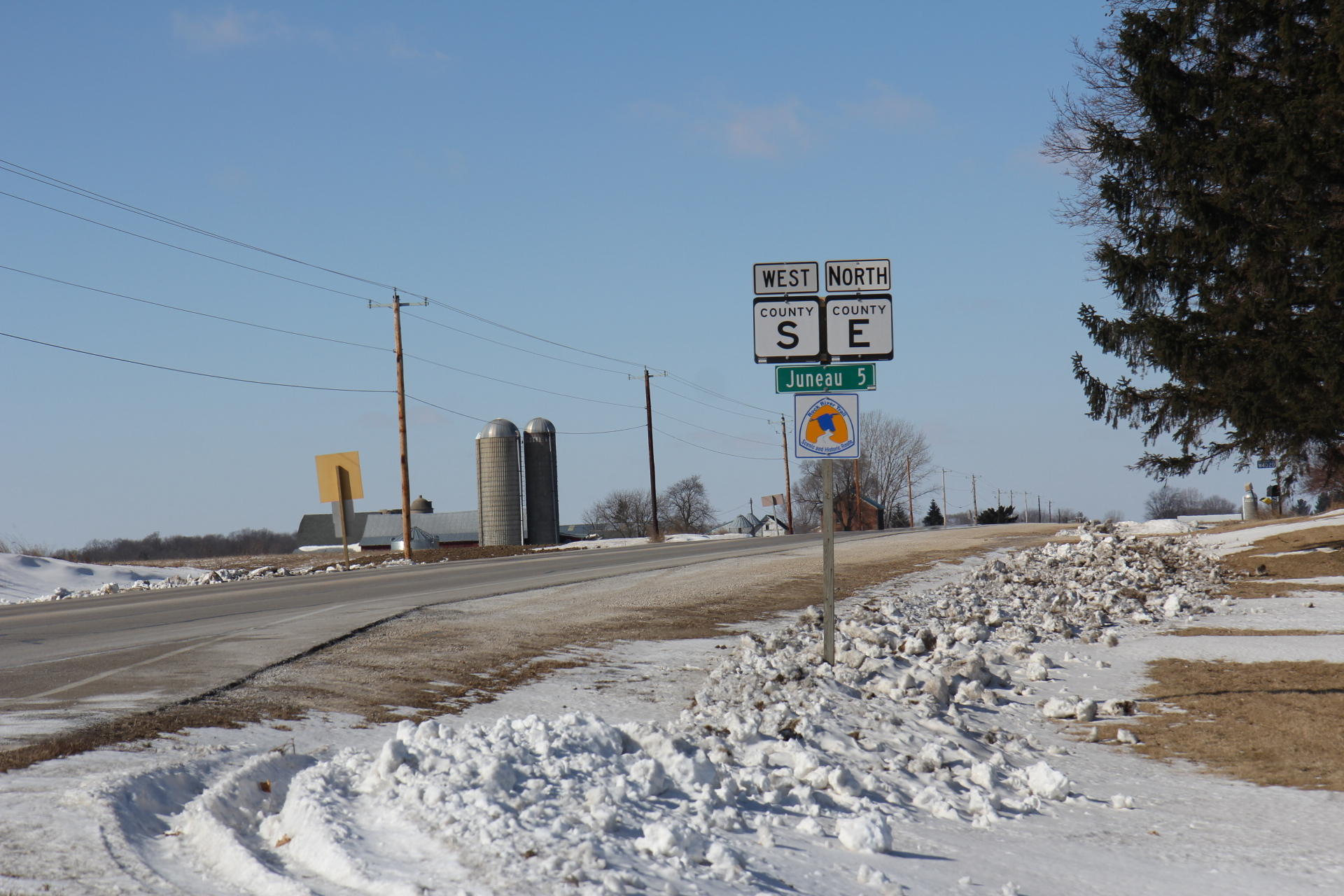
The Rock River Trail in Dodge County, Wisconsin

== Recreation ==
The river is used for various water and paddling sports. The Rock River Water Trail is on the river from its headwaters above the Horicon National Wildlife Refuge in south central Wisconsin to the confluence with the Mississippi River at the Quad Cities of Illinois and Iowa 330 miles downriver. It crosses five counties in Wisconsin, six counties in Illinois and runs through 37 municipalities. The slow moving river passes scenic rural landscapes, wilderness areas and urban areas. The first two trailheads are at Waupun County Park in Waupun, Wisconsin and Rivers Edge Park in Theresa, Wisconsin and there are 32 additional access points in Dodge County, Wisconsin. The trail is part of the National Water Trails System and the first National Water Trail in Wisconsin and Illinois.

Rock River Park is on County Road B about a half mile west of Johnson Creek, Wisconsin in Jefferson County, Wisconsin and offers river access and an artesian spring.

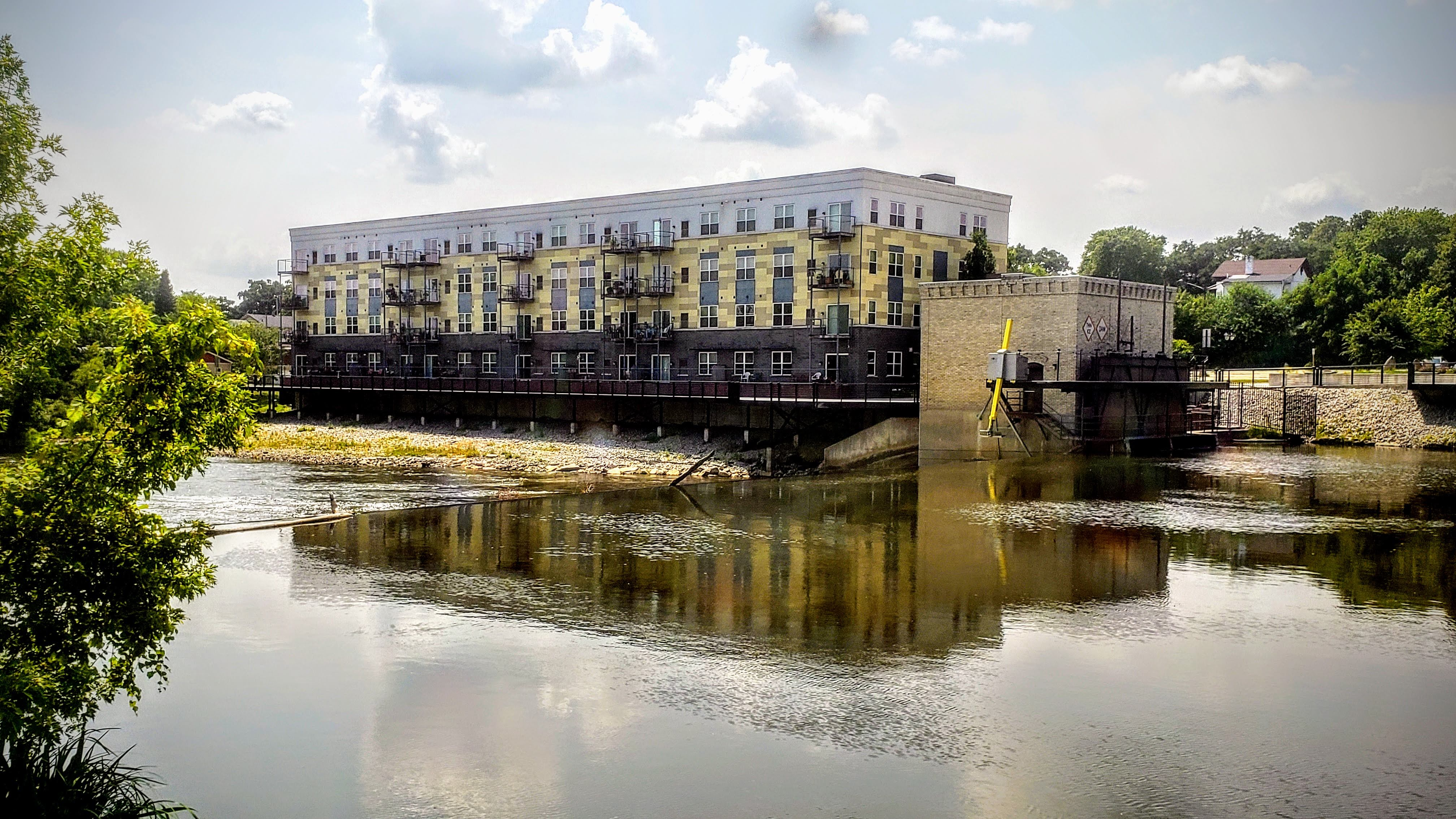
Watertown River Walk 02

The river is also home to the Rock Aqua Jays, an amateur water ski club that performs at Traxler Park in downtown Janesville, Wisconsin.

== Cities and villages along the river ==
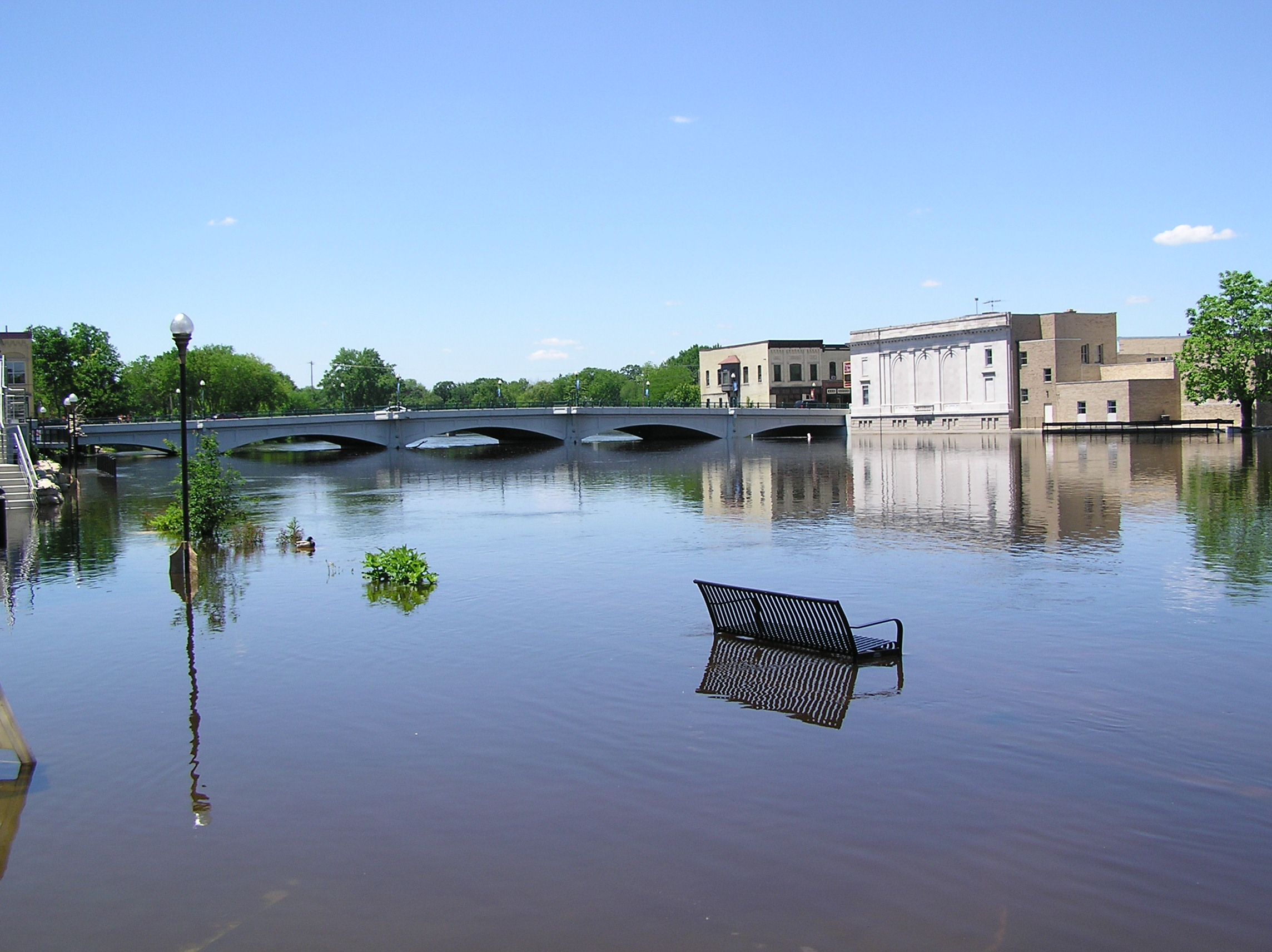
Rock River flooding downtown Fort Atkinson, June 2004

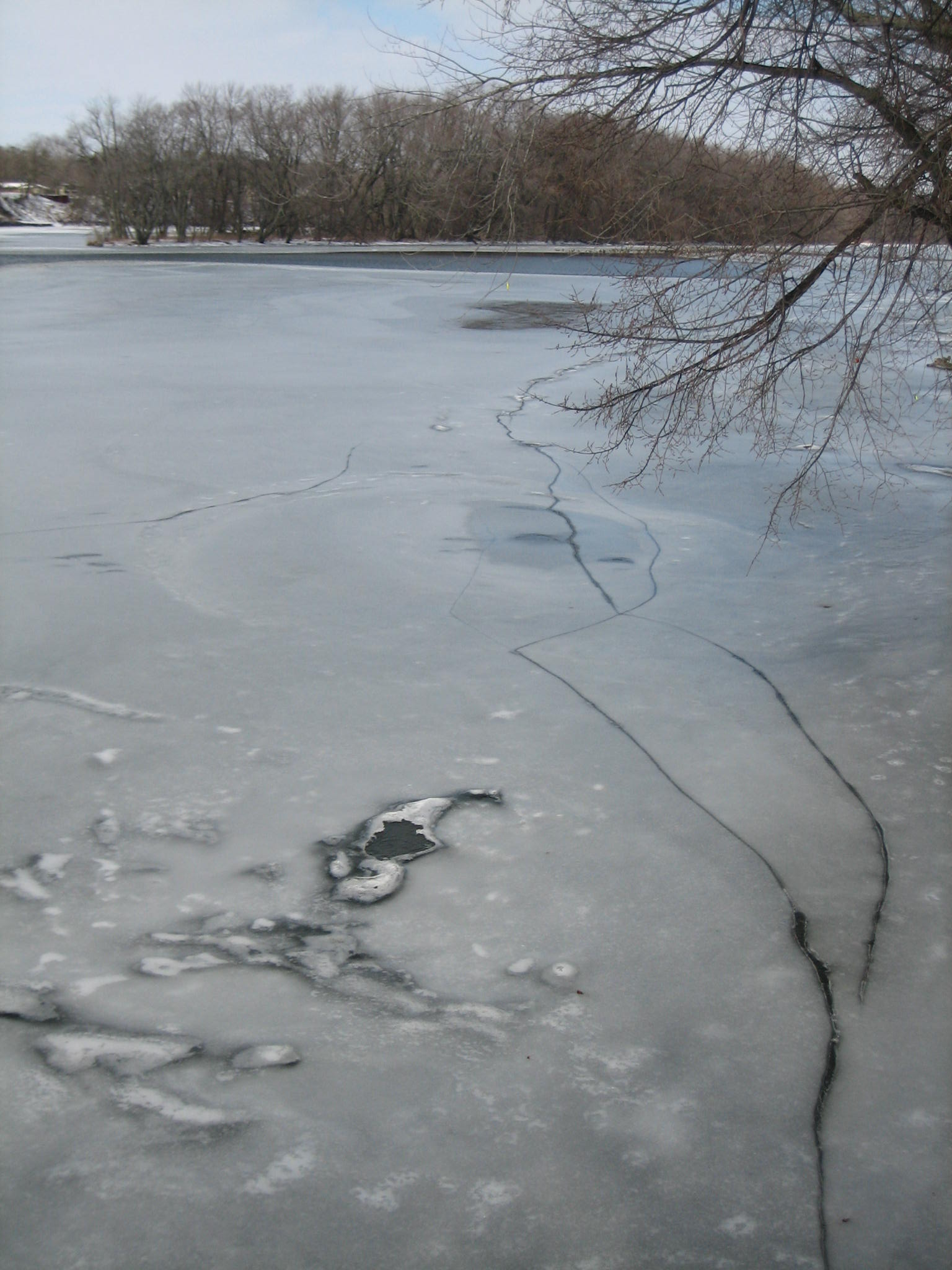
The frozen Rock River near Oregon, Illinois

Communities listed from north to south.

- Brandon, Wisconsin (West Branch)
- Waupun, Wisconsin (South Branch)
- Theresa, Wisconsin (East Branch)
- Mayville, Wisconsin (East Branch)
- Kekoskee, Wisconsin (East Branch)
- Horicon, Wisconsin
- Hustisford, Wisconsin
- Ixonia, Wisconsin
- Watertown, Wisconsin
- Johnson Creek, Wisconsin
- Jefferson, Wisconsin
- Fort Atkinson, Wisconsin
- Indianford, Wisconsin
- Fulton, Wisconsin
- Janesville, Wisconsin
- Afton, Wisconsin
- Beloit, Wisconsin
- South Beloit, Illinois
- Rockton, Illinois
- Roscoe, Illinois
- Machesney Park, Illinois
- Loves Park, Illinois
- Rockford, Illinois
- Byron, Illinois
- Oregon, Illinois
- Grand Detour, Illinois
- Dixon, Illinois
- Sterling, Illinois
- Rock Falls, Illinois
- Lyndon, Illinois
- Prophetstown, Illinois
- Erie, Illinois
- Hillsdale, Illinois
- Cleveland, Illinois
- Colona, Illinois
- Moline, Illinois
- Coal Valley, Illinois
- Milan, Illinois
- Rock Island, Illinois

== See also ==
- List of Illinois rivers
- List of Wisconsin rivers
