= Kekoskee, Wisconsin =

- Village
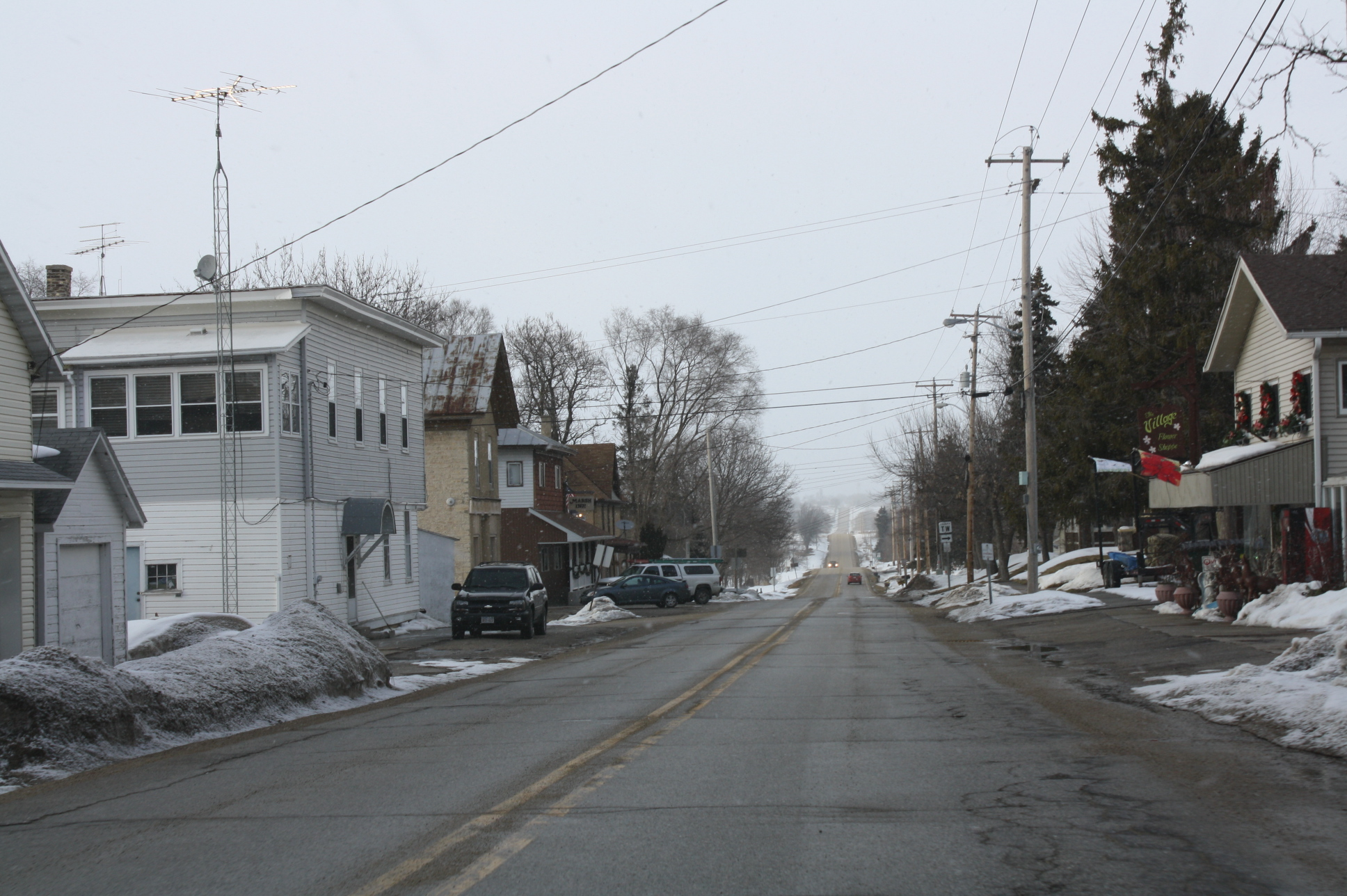
- Looking north at downtown Kekoskee

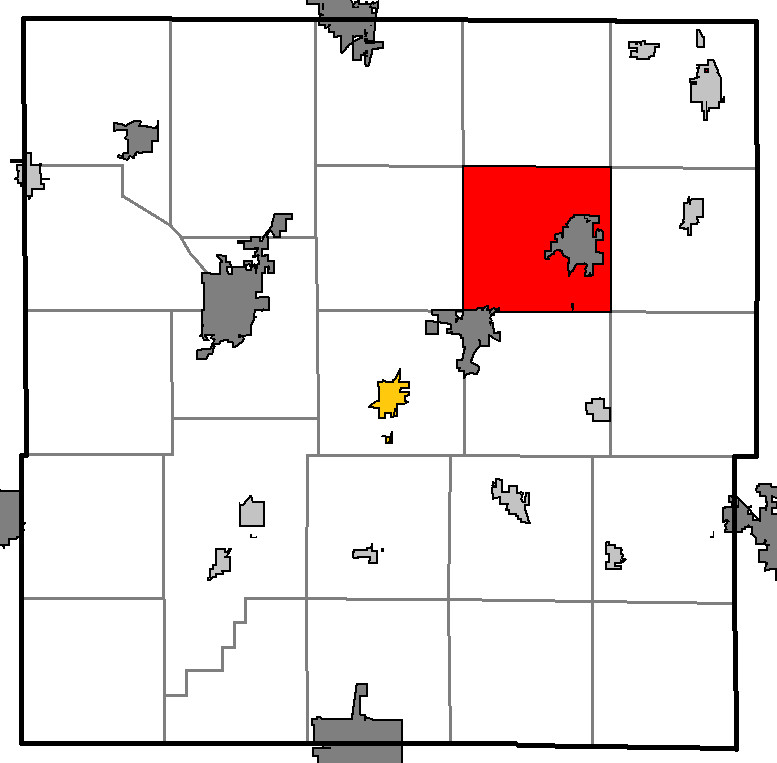
- Location of Kekoskee in Dodge County, Wisconsin
- Coordinates: 43°31′45″N 88°33′48″W
- Country: United States
- State: Wisconsin
- County: Dodge

Area
  - Total: 33.61 sq mi (87.04 km^{2})
  - Land: 31.69 sq mi (82.08 km^{2})
  - Water: 1.92 sq mi (4.96 km^{2})
- Elevation: 915 ft (279 m)

Population (2020)
  - Total: 896
  - Density: 28.3/sq mi (10.9/km^{2})
- Time zone: UTC-6 (Central (CST))
  - Summer (DST): UTC-5 (CDT)
- FIPS code: 55-38900
- GNIS feature ID: 1567376
- Website: kekoskee.gov

Map of Kekoskee located in Dodge County, Wisconsin, before the consolidation in 2018.

Kekoskee is a village in Dodge County, Wisconsin, United States. The population was 896 at the 2020 census, a notable increase of 161 people at the 2010 census. This is because the village itself and the town of Williamstown both decided to consolidate within 2018, due to Williamstown struggling to seat a full village board, leaving only 163 acres left of the town.

== Geography ==
Kekoskee is located at 43°31′45″N 88°33′48″W (43.529239, -88.563212).

According to the United States Census Bureau, the village has a total area of 0.25 square miles (0.65 km^{2}), of which 0.23 square miles (0.60 km^{2}) is land and 0.02 square miles (0.05 km^{2}) is water.

== Demographics ==
Historical population
Census	Pop.	Note	%±
1880	188		—
1960	247		—
1970	233		−5.7%
1980	224		−3.9%
1990	188		−16.1%
2000	169		−10.1%
2010	161		−4.7%
2020	896		456.5%
U.S. Decennial Census

=== 2010 census ===
As of the census of 2010, there were 161 people, 69 households, and 51 families living in the village. The population density was 700.0 inhabitants per square mile (270.3/km^{2}). There were 73 housing units at an average density of 317.4 per square mile (122.5/km^{2}). The racial makeup of the village was 98.1% White and 1.9% from two or more races. Hispanic or Latino people of any race were 1.9% of the population.

There were 69 households, of which 27.5% had children under the age of 18 living with them, 66.7% were married couples living together, 2.9% had a female householder with no husband present, 4.3% had a male householder with no wife present, and 26.1% were non-families. 23.2% of all households were made up of individuals, and 10.1% had someone living alone who was 65 years of age or older. The average household size was 2.33 and the average family size was 2.73.

The median age in the village was 43.8 years. 16.8% of residents were under the age of 18; 6.1% were between the ages of 18 and 24; 27.4% were from 25 to 44; 32.9% were from 45 to 64; and 16.8% were 65 years of age or older. The gender makeup of the village was 52.8% male and 47.2% female.

=== 2000 census ===
As of the census of 2000, there were 169 people, 66 households, and 51 families living in the village. The population density was 719.9 people per square mile (283.7/km^{2}). There were 66 housing units at an average density of 281.1 per square mile (110.8/km^{2}). The racial makeup of the village was 92.90% White, 5.33% Asian, 1.18% from other races, and 0.59% from two or more races. Hispanic or Latino people of any race were 1.78% of the population.

There were 66 households, out of which 27.3% had children under the age of 18 living with them, 63.6% were married couples living together, 6.1% had a female householder with no husband present, and 22.7% were non-families. 22.7% of all households were made up of individuals, and 10.6% had someone living alone who was 65 years of age or older. The average household size was 2.56 and the average family size was 2.94.

In the village, the population was spread out, with 21.9% under the age of 18, 7.1% from 18 to 24, 28.4% from 25 to 44, 25.4% from 45 to 64, and 17.2% who were 65 years of age or older. The median age was 42 years. For every 100 females, there were 134.7 males. For every 100 females age 18 and over, there were 140.0 males.

The median income for a household in the village was $38,750, and the median income for a family was $47,500. Males had a median income of $33,281 versus $26,667 for females. The per capita income for the village was $18,822. None of the families and 1.1% of the population were living below the poverty line, including those who are under eighteens and 5.6% of those who are over 64.

== Education ==
Children residing within the village limits of Kekoskee attend the Mayville and Horicon School Districts.

== Images ==
View of the Rock River in Kekoskee

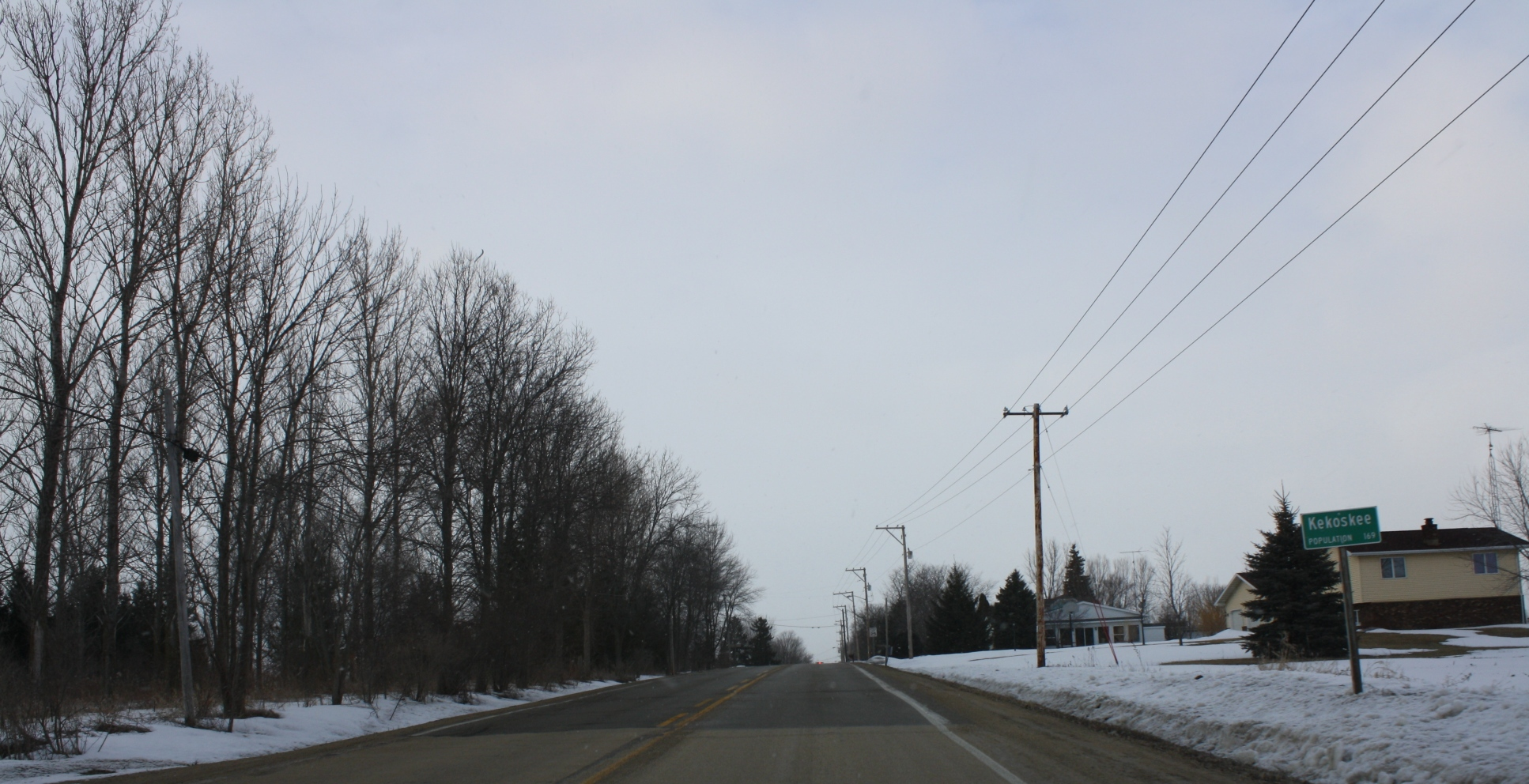
Welcome sign

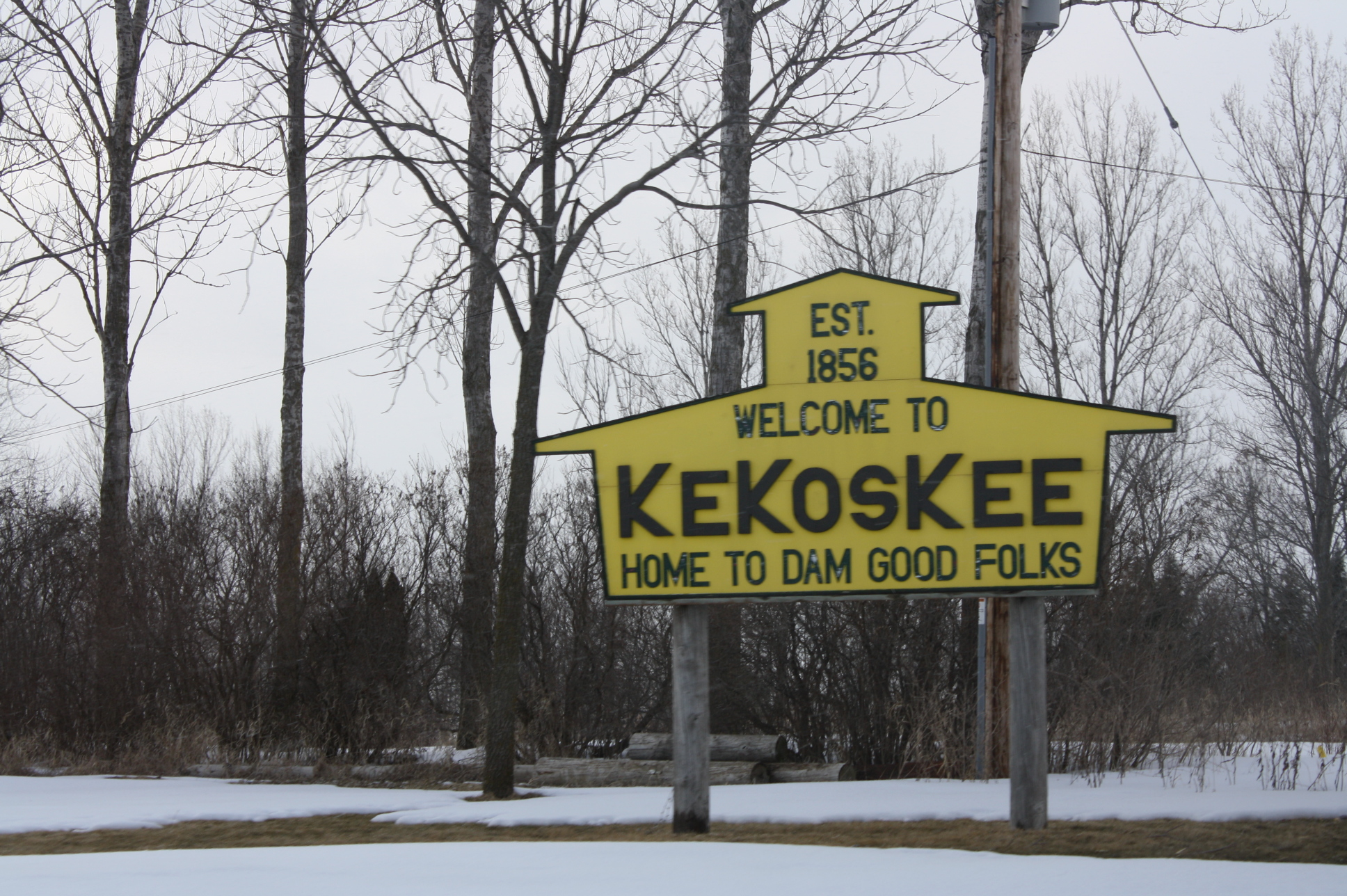
Village welcome sign
