= Willard Greenfield Farmstead =

- U.S. National Register of Historic Places
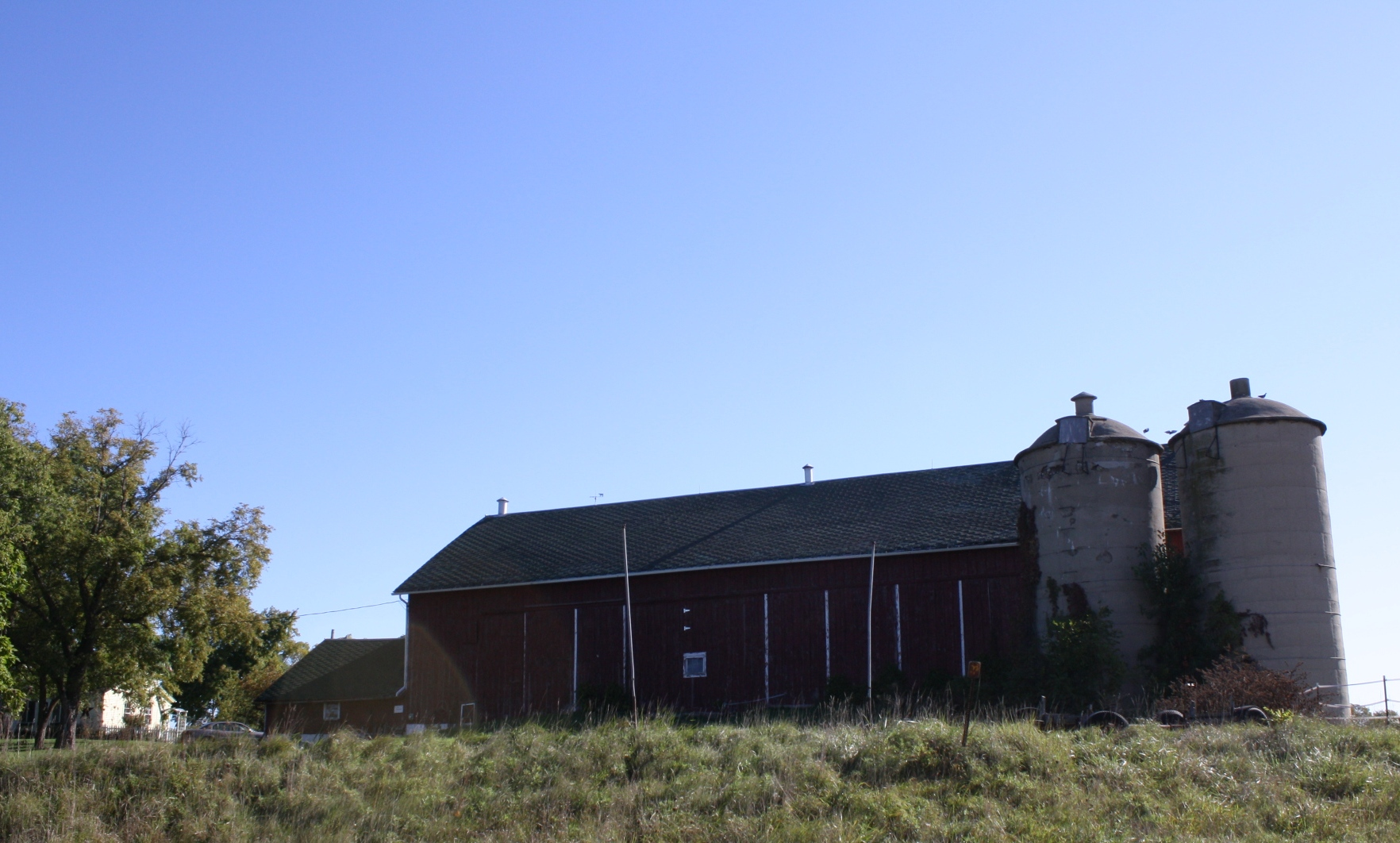
- Willard Greenfield Farmstead
- Location: N-7436 WI Trunk Hwy. 26; Burnett, Wisconsin
- Area: 5.2 acres (2.1 ha)
- Built: 1862
- Architectural style: Greek Revival
- NRHP reference No.: 92001557
- Added to NRHP: November 5, 1992

The Willard Greenfield Farmstead is located in Burnett, Wisconsin.

== Description ==
The site includes a Greek Revival-styled farmhouse built in 1862 by Greenfield, an immigrant from New York and one of the first settlers in Dodge County. Also 1891 fieldstone smokehouse, 1895 dairy barn, 1900 machine shed, 1920 poultry barn, 1920 corn crib, two concrete silos built in 1929 and 1930, and a 1935 2-hole privy.

It was added to the State and the National Register of Historic Places in 1992.
