= North Washington Street Historic District (Watertown, Wisconsin) =

Historic district in Wisconsin, United States

- U.S. National Register of Historic Places
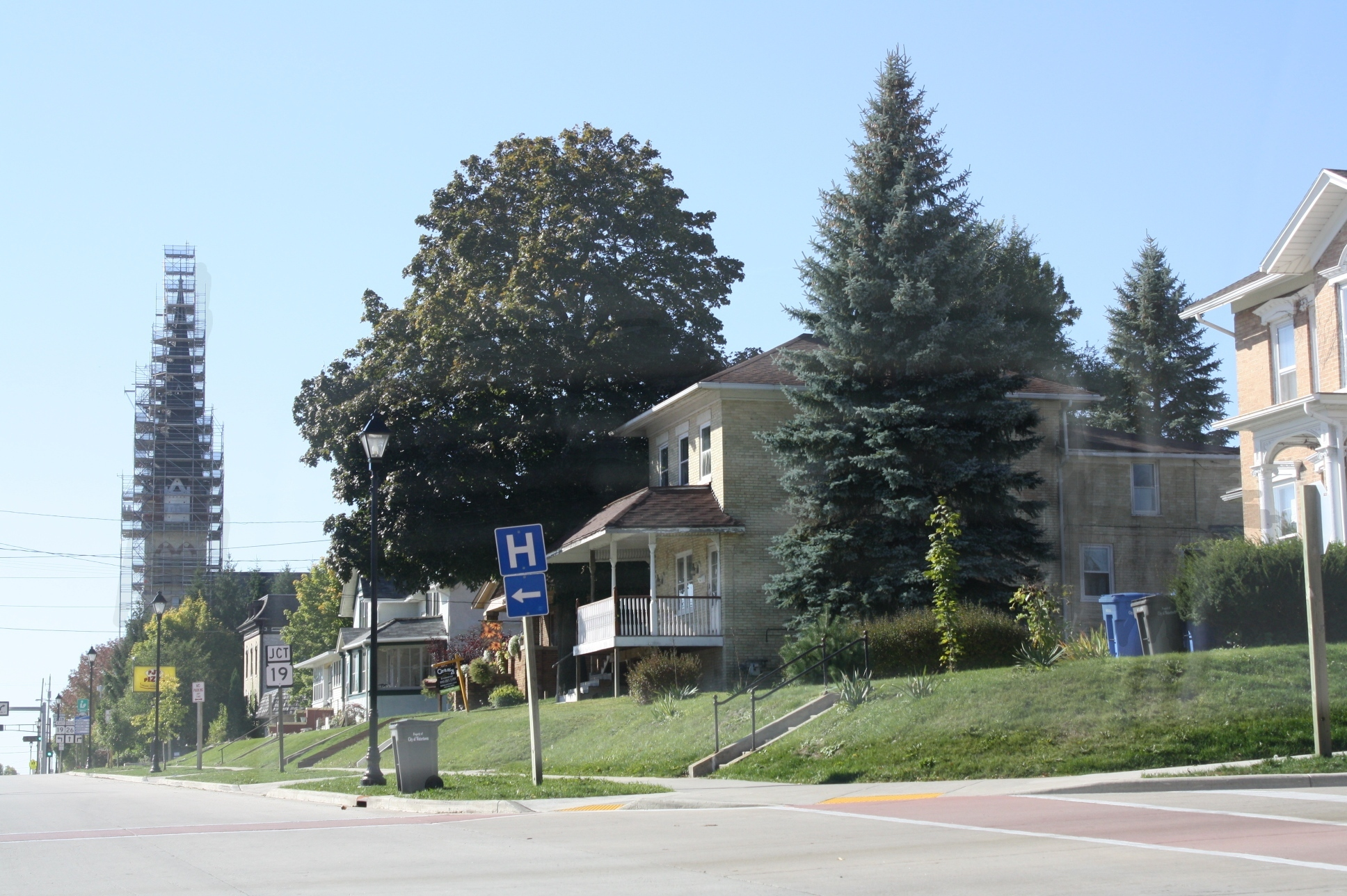

- Location within Wisconsin
- Location: N. Church St. generally bounded by O'Connell and N. Green Street., N. Washington St. bounded by O'Connell and Elm Sts., Watertown, Wisconsin
- Coordinates: 43.197369°N 88.728864°W
- Area: 27 acres (11 ha)
- Built: 1849
- Architectural style: Italianate, Second Empire, Queen Anne; Revivals
- NRHP reference No.: 09000850
- Added to NRHP: October 23, 2009

The North Washington Street Historic District in Watertown, Wisconsin is a 27 acres (11 ha) historic district which was listed on the National Register of Historic Places in 2009. It included 102 contributing buildings and eight non-contributing ones.

It spans the border of Dodge County, Wisconsin and Jefferson County, Wisconsin. It runs along N. Church St. generally bounded by O'Connell and N. Green St., and along N. Washington St. bounded by O'Connell and Elm Sts.

It is a residential district with homes in various sizes and styles, unified by a lot of local cream brick. Examples include the 1849/1870 Italianate Kusel house, the 1855 simple front gable house at 423 N Church, the 1877 Second Empire Cody house, the 1894 Queen Anne Woodard house, the 1910 American Foursquare Schimmel house, the 1915 Craftsman Calhoun house, the 1929 Dutch Colonial Revival Baumann house, and the 1930 Tudor Revival Salick house.
