= John Hustis House =

Historic house in Wisconsin, United States

- U.S. National Register of Historic Places
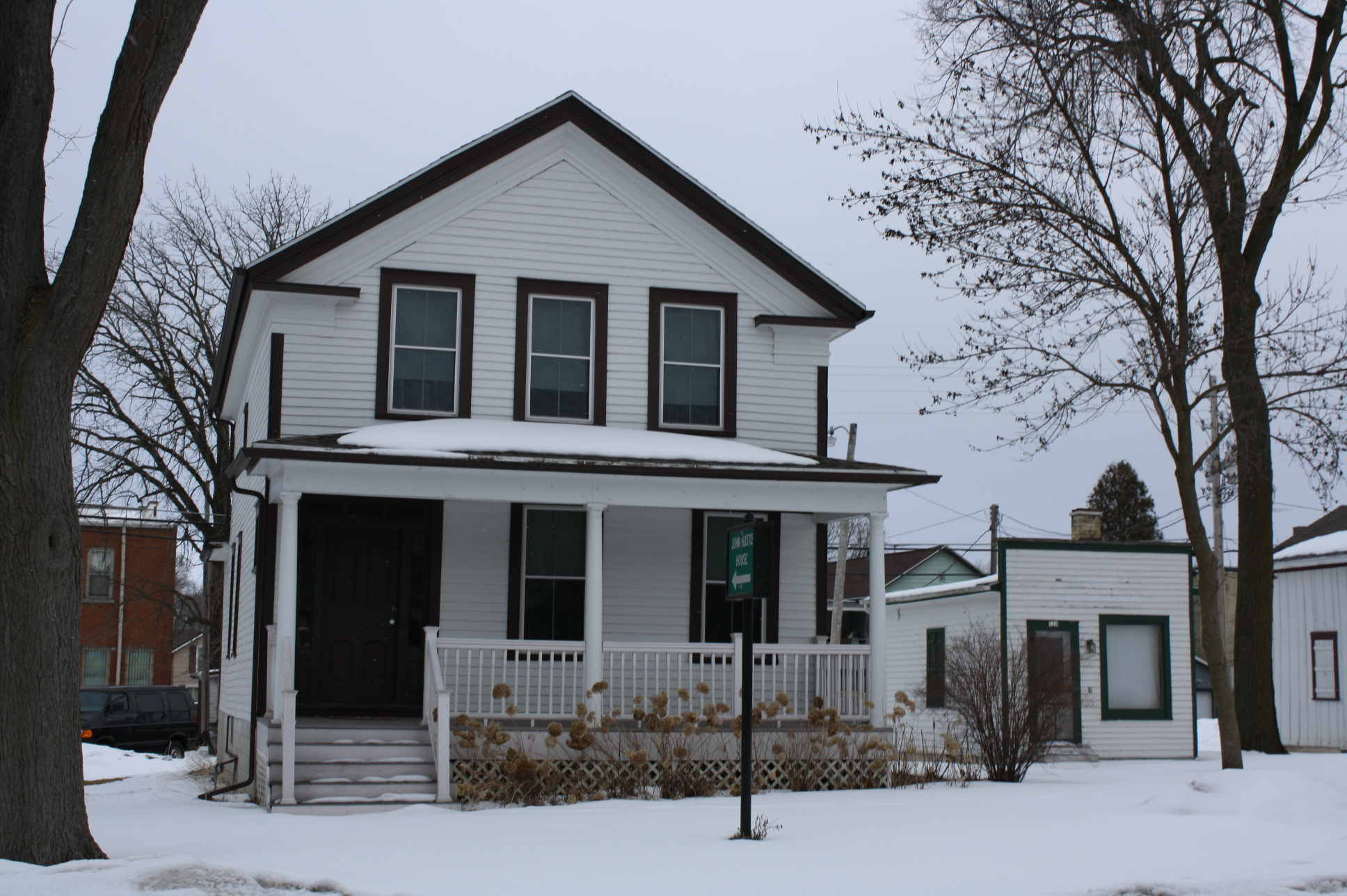
- John Hustis House
- Location: N. Ridge St., Hustisford, Wisconsin
- Coordinates: 43°20′49″N 88°36′05″W
- Area: less than one acre
- Built: 1857
- Architect: Merrit Wiltse
- Architectural style: Greek Revival
- NRHP reference No.: 83003371
- Added to NRHP: March 10, 1983

The John Hustis House is located in Hustisford, Wisconsin.

== History ==
John Hustis was the founder and namesake of Hustisford. He would reside in the house until his death in 1907. Since then, it has been acquired by the local historical society and turned into a museum. It was listed on the National Register of Historic Places in 1983 and on the State Register of Historic Places in 1989.
