= Ferdinand C. Hartwig House =

Historic house in Wisconsin, United States

- U.S. National Register of Historic Places
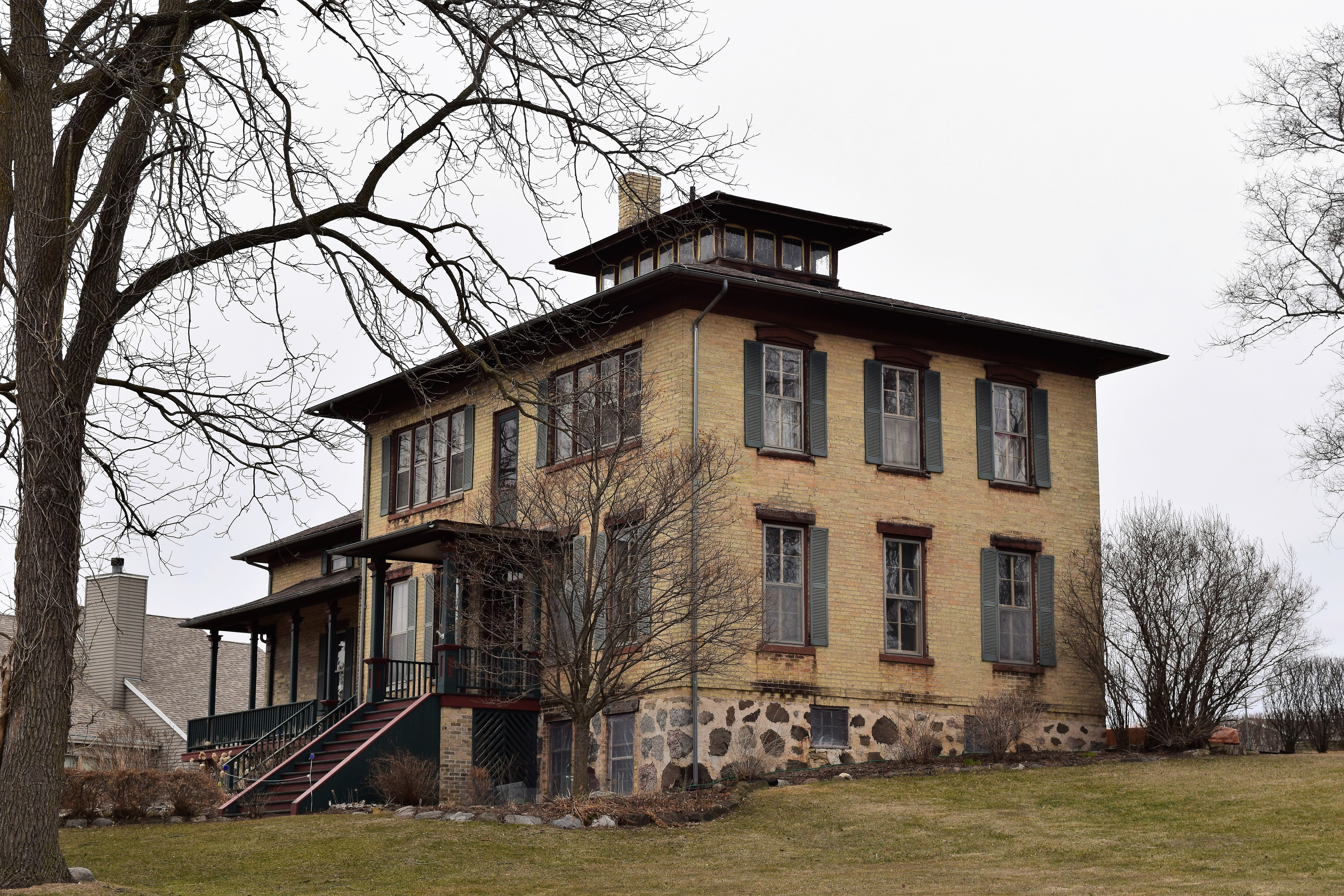

- Location within Wisconsin Location within the United States
- Location: 908 Country Lane; Watertown, Wisconsin
- Coordinates: 43°12′17″N 88°44′44″W
- Built: 1864
- Architectural style: Italianate
- NRHP reference No.: 82000662
- Added to NRHP: June 17, 1982

The Ferdinand C. Hartwig House is a historic house located at 908 Country Lane in Watertown, Wisconsin. It was added to the National Register of Historic Places on June 17, 1982.

== History ==
The house was built by Prussian immigrant Ferdinand Hartwig. It was later bought by Kirby and Judith Brant. Current owners Jerold & Jill LaPinske 1998 to present.
