= Hustisford, Wisconsin =

- Village
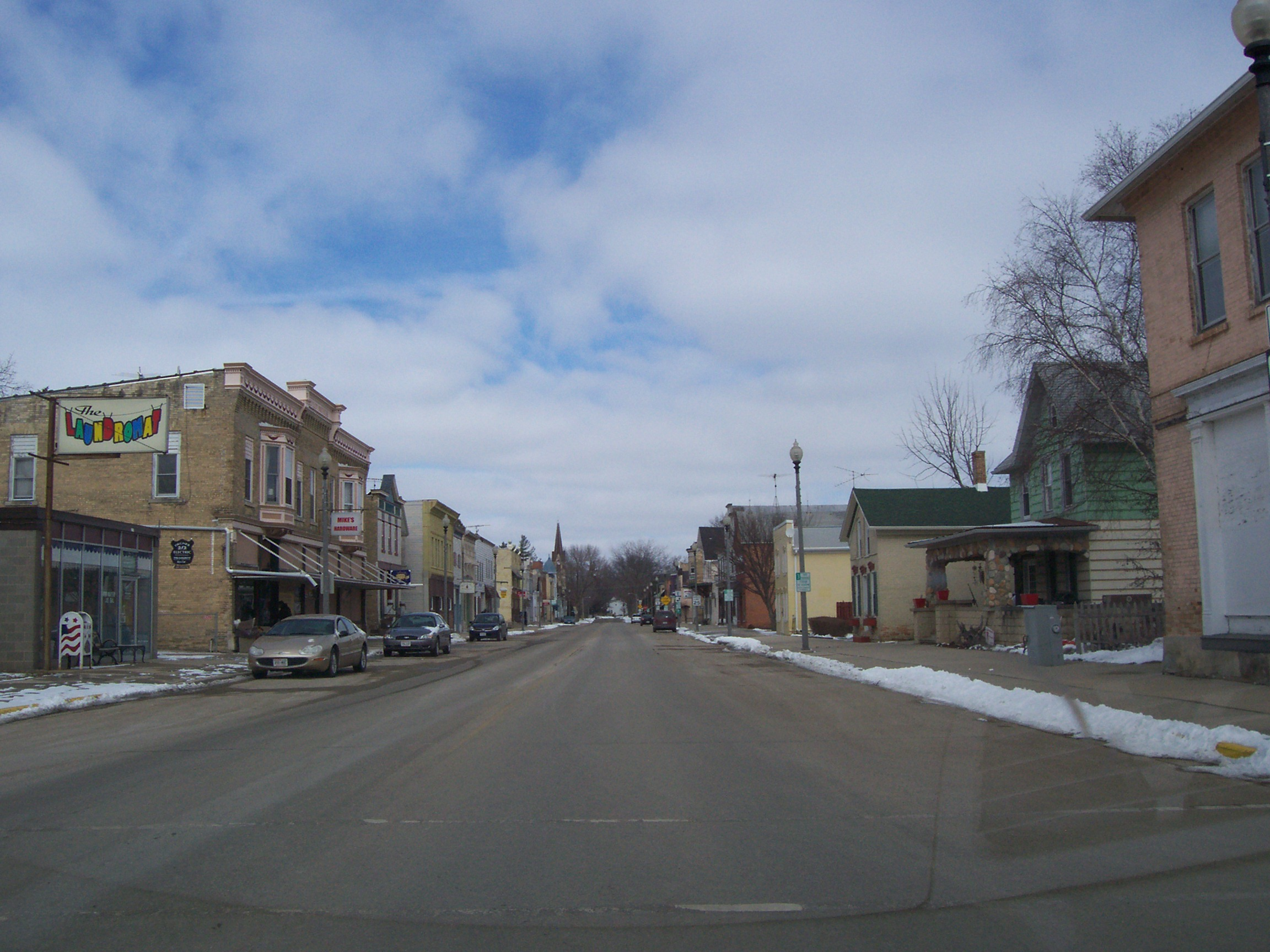
- Downtown Hustisford
- Nickname: Husty
- Location of Hustisford in Dodge County, Wisconsin
- Coordinates: 43°20′1″N 88°35′51″W
- Country: United States
- State: Wisconsin
- County: Dodge

Area
  - Total: 1.33 sq mi (3.45 km^{2})
  - Land: 1.12 sq mi (2.89 km^{2})
  - Water: 0.22 sq mi (0.56 km^{2})
- Elevation: 863 ft (263 m)

Population (2020)
  - Total: 1,101
  - Estimate (2022): 1,085
  - Density: 972.4/sq mi (375.43/km^{2})
- Time zone: UTC-6 (Central (CST))
  - Summer (DST): UTC-5 (CDT)
- Area code: 920
- FIPS code: 55-36650
- GNIS feature ID: 1566830
- Website: www.hustisford.com

Hustisford is a village in Dodge County, Wisconsin, United States. The population was 1,101 at the 2020 census. The village is located within the town of Hustisford.

== History ==
The village was named for John Hustis, a pioneer settler.

== Geography ==
Hustisford is located at 43°20′43″N 88°36′4″W (43.345528, -88.60135).

According to the United States Census Bureau, the village has a total area of 1.10 square miles (2.85 km^{2}), of which 0.89 square miles (2.31 km^{2}) is land and 0.21 square miles (0.54 km^{2}) is water.

The village is bordered to the north by Lake Sinissippi, a shallow lake fed by the Rock River flowing from the Horicon Marsh, a bird sanctuary north of Hustisford. The lake hosts ice racing on Sundays in January and February.

== Demographics ==
Historical population
Census	Pop.	Note	%±
1880	488		—
1890	513		5.1%
1900	540		5.3%
1910	615		13.9%
1920	595		−3.3%
1930	537		−9.7%
1940	564		5.0%
1950	622		10.3%
1960	708		13.8%
1970	789		11.4%
1980	874		10.8%
1990	979		12.0%
2000	1,135		15.9%
2010	1,123		−1.1%
2020	1,101		−2.0%
2022 (est.)	1,085	▼	−1.5%
U.S. Decennial Census

Beginning in the middle of the 1800s Hustisford had a German immigrant community. At one time it had two German-speaking churches, with one, Bethany Lutheran Church, continuing to have German worship in the 1970s. In addition, two of three schools in the period used German as a language of instruction.

=== 2010 census ===
As of the census of 2010, there were 1,123 people, 477 households, and 309 families living in the village. The population density was 1,261.8 inhabitants per square mile (487.2/km^{2}). There were 532 housing units at an average density of 597.8 per square mile (230.8/km^{2}). The racial makeup of the village was 97.2% White, 0.5% African American, 1.0% Native American, 0.6% Asian, 0.1% from other races, and 0.5% from two or more races. Hispanic or Latino people of any race were 2.9% of the population.

There were 477 households, of which 29.8% had children under the age of 18 living with them, 49.5% were married couples living together, 8.6% had a female householder with no husband present, 6.7% had a male householder with no wife present, and 35.2% were non-families. 28.9% of all households were made up of individuals, and 10% had someone living alone who was 65 years of age or older. The average household size was 2.35 and the average family size was 2.89.

The median age in the village was 39.4 years. 22.4% of residents were under the age of 18; 8.5% were between the ages of 18 and 24; 27.4% were from 25 to 44; 27.4% were from 45 to 64; and 14.4% were 65 years of age or older. The gender makeup of the village was 52.1% male and 47.9% female.

=== 2000 census ===
As of the census of 2000, there were 1,135 people, 472 households, and 296 families living in the village. The population density was 1,402.6 people per square mile (541.0/km^{2}). There were 498 housing units at an average density of 615.4 per square mile (237.4/km^{2}). The racial makeup of the village was 99.21% White, 0.09% Black or African American, 0.35% Native American, 0.35% from other races. 1.23% of the population were Hispanic or Latino of any race.

There were 472 households, out of which 31.4% had children under the age of 18 living with them, 51.7% were married couples living together, 7.6% had a female householder with no husband present, and 37.1% were non-families. 31.1% of all households were made up of individuals, and 15.5% had someone living alone who was 65 years of age or older. The average household size was 2.40 and the average family size was 3.03.

In the village, the population was spread out, with 26.3% under the age of 18, 6.9% from 18 to 24, 30.6% from 25 to 44, 20.6% from 45 to 64, and 15.6% who were 65 years of age or older. The median age was 36 years. For every 100 females, there were 96.7 males. For every 100 females age 18 and over, there were 97.6 males.

The median income for a household in the village was $40,929, and the median income for a family was $52,262. Males had a median income of $31,951 versus $23,333 for females. The per capita income for the village was $20,599. About 1.7% of families and 2.7% of the population were below the poverty line, including 2.0% of those under age 18 and 6.5% of those age 65 or over.

== Education ==
Hustisford School District operates public schools, including Hustisford High School. In September 2026, the school district suspended operations as the result of a failed tax referendum. Most of the district's students now attend schools in the nearby Dodgeland School District.

Bethany Lutheran School is a Christian Pre-K through 8th grade school of the Wisconsin Evangelical Lutheran Synod in Hustisford.

== Toilet Bowl ==
Each year on January 1, the Hustisford Fire Department hosts the Toilet Bowl Parade and Toilet Bowl game. The parade goes through downtown Hustisford twice. The game is held at the Fireman's Park in Hustisford and is an unpadded, tackle football game. In order to play in the game, one must have lived in Hustisford, attended Hustisford High School, or worked in Hustisford.

== Notable people ==
- John W.O. Brenner, religious leader
- Jeff Fitzgerald, Republican state representative and lobbyist
- Scott L. Fitzgerald (brother of Jeff), Republican State Senator
- Gwen Gillen, artist and sculptor
- August Heinrich Lehmann, restaurateur and legislator
- William T. Ward, hotelier and legislator

== Images ==
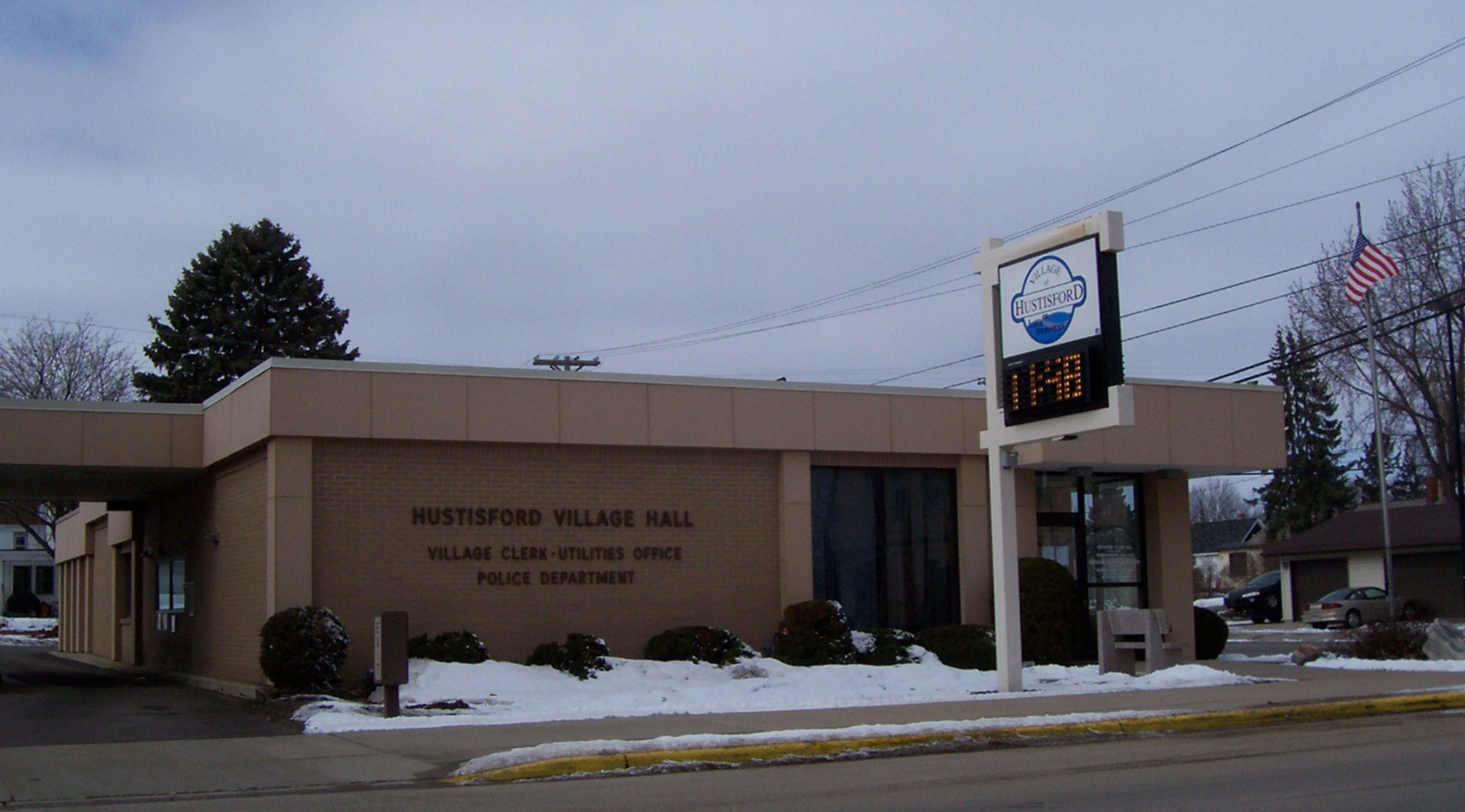
Village hall

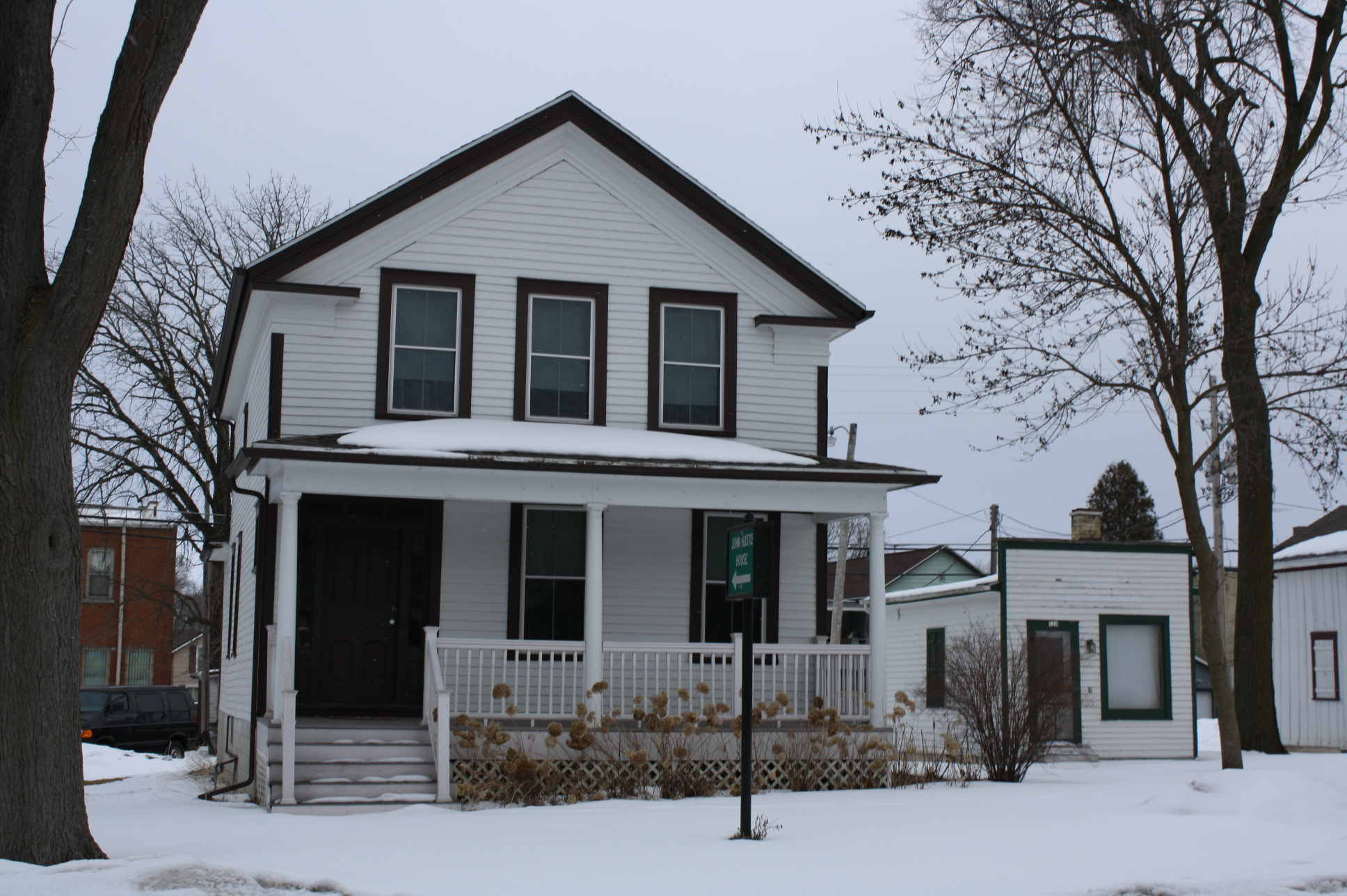
John Hustis House, historic house

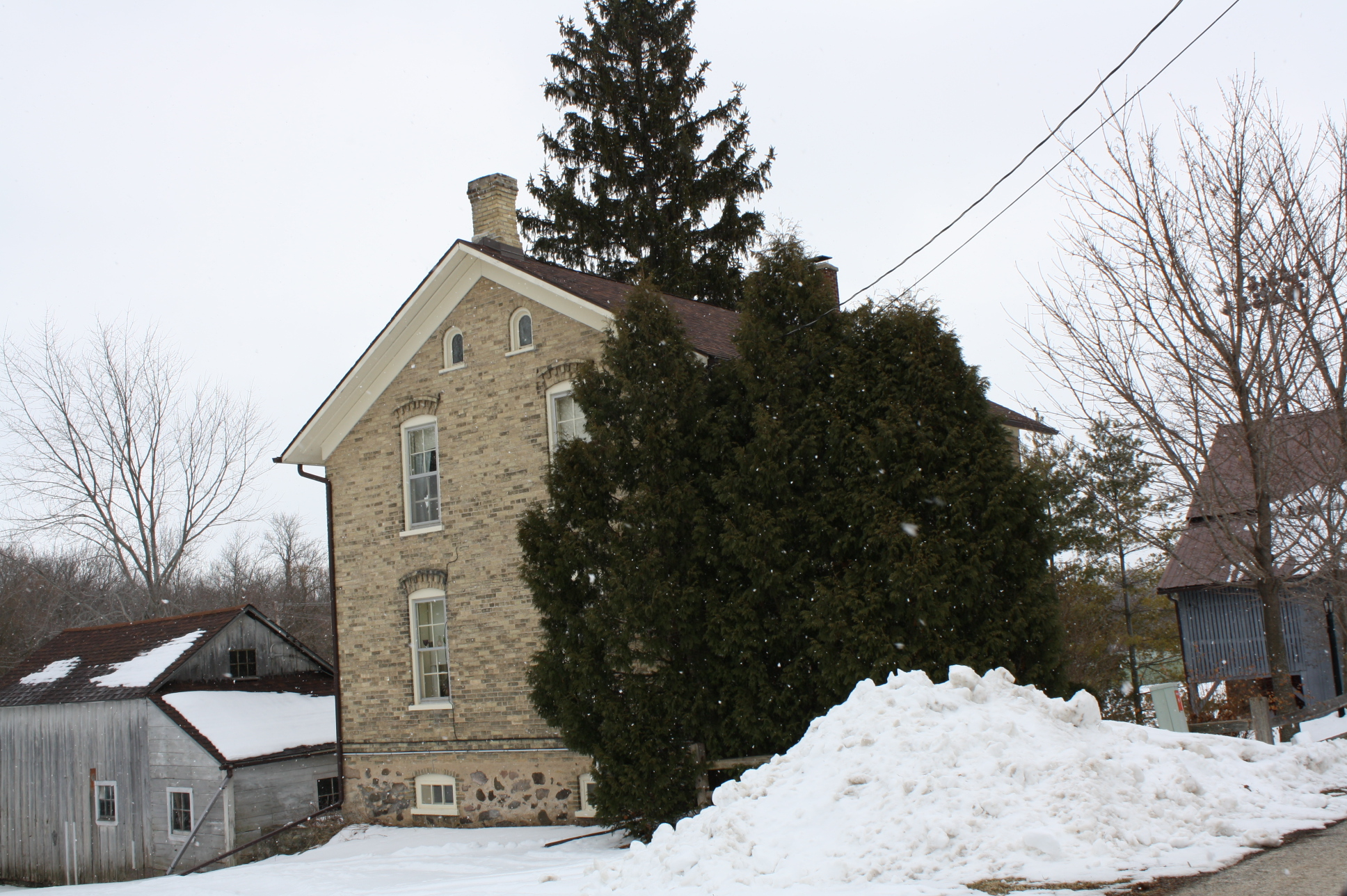
Ferdinand Schulze House, historic house

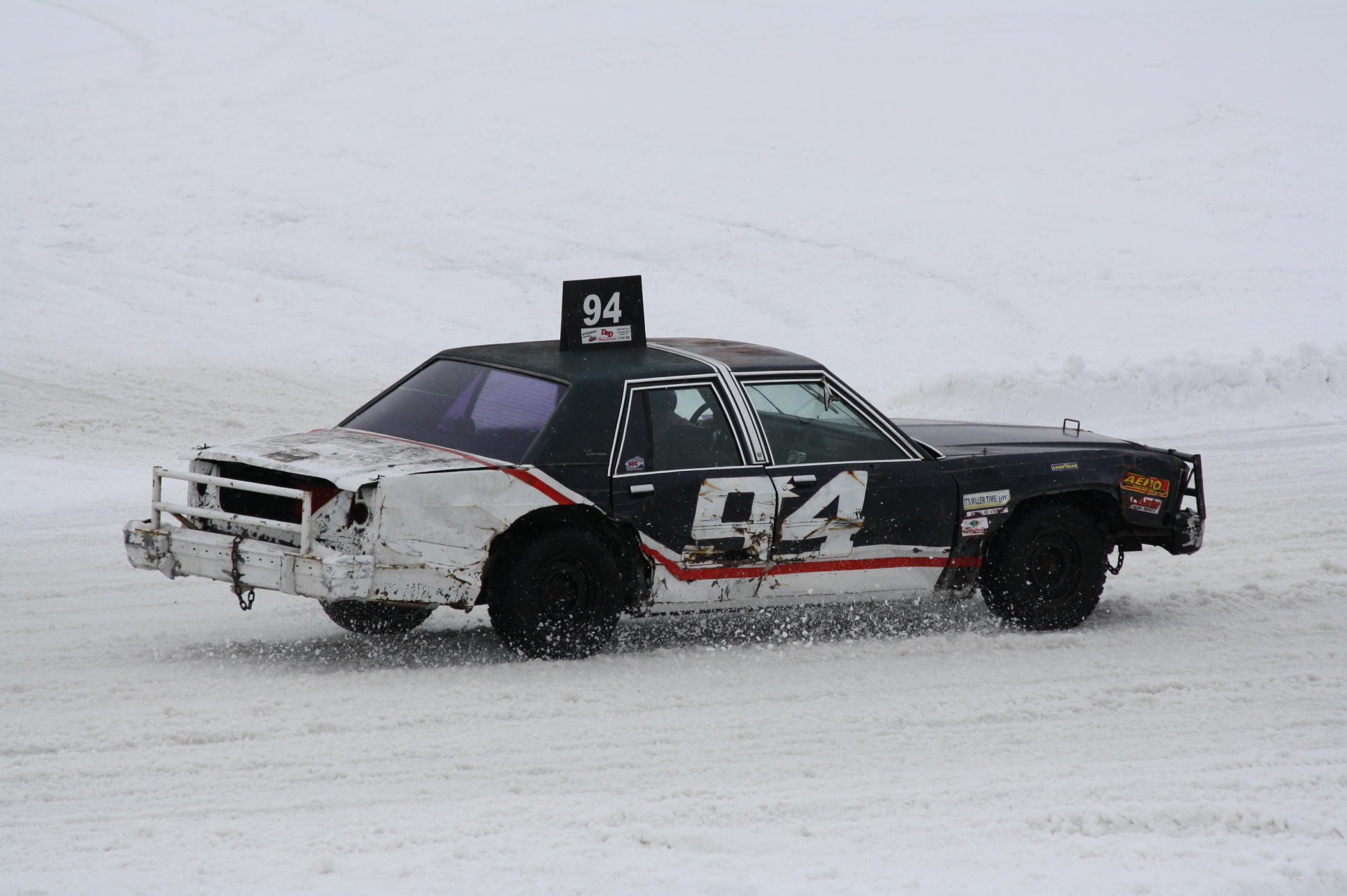
Ice racing on Lake Sinissippi
