= Malleable Iron Range Company =

Household appliance maker (1896–1985)

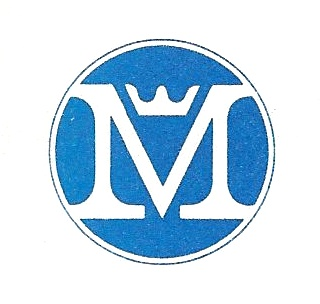
- Industry: Household Appliances
- Founded: 1896
- Founder: Silas McClure; A. C. Terrell
- Defunct: 1985
- Headquarters: St. Louis, Missouri; Beaver Dam, Wisconsin
- Key people: Andrew G. Hill, President 1902–1921; Fred W Rogers, Pres. 1921–1932; Herbert T Burrow, Pres. 1936–1970; Michael J Maier, Pres. 1970–1976; Michael W Maier, Pres. 1976–1985
- Products: kitchen ranges, refrigerators, stoves

Malleable Iron Range Company was a company that produced kitchen ranges made of malleable iron and other related products. The company existed from 1896 to 1985. Its primary trademark was Monarch and it was often referred to as the Monarch Company.

== History ==
=== Early years ===
The Malleable Iron Range Company was founded in St. Louis, Missouri, in 1896 by Silas McClure and A. C. Terrell. The company was incorporated in 1899 with Monarch as a trademark.

In 1900 the Dauntless Stove Manufacturing Company of Omaha, Nebraska, became indebted to the Beaver Dam Malleable Iron Works for $5000 for castings ordered by Dauntless from the Iron Works. Consequently, the machinery and equipment of Dauntless was moved to Beaver Dam, Wisconsin. In January, 1901, a new company was organized in Beaver Dam under the name Dauntless Manufacturing Company.

In July 1901, McClure and Terrell of the Malleable Iron Range Company of St. Louis negotiated an agreement under which they became associated with Dauntless, subsequently moving their business to Beaver Dam. In February 1902, Dauntless Manufacturing Company name was changed to the Malleable Iron Range Company. In 1902, the company had about 20 employees. The average price of its ranges was about $60 ($2,200 in 2025 dollars), which was about twice the selling price of the typical range of the time. Despite the high price, the ranges sold well as they were recognized as being a much better quality and easier to use than the typical range sold at the time.

At the Lewis and Clark Centennial Exposition in Portland, Oregon, in 1905, the Monarch was awarded the highest prize, the World's Fair Gold Medal. At the Alaska–Yukon–Pacific Exposition in Seattle, in 1909, the Monarch was awarded the gold medal.

Prior to 1910, the malleable iron castings needed for their products were purchased from other companies until they could build their own foundry. Additions to the manufacturing building and annealing building were also built in 1910. In 1912 a warehouse was constructed that was later used as a machine shop. In 1914 a steel room was built and in 1916 an oxidizing building and additional casting and storage buildings were constructed.

Despite the appearance that Malleable was poised for long term successes, this was not guaranteed. There were many stove manufacturers that did not survive the coming decades. The 1918 Engineering Directory has eight pages listing approximately 400 manufacturers of stoves in the United States.

=== 1919–1941 ===
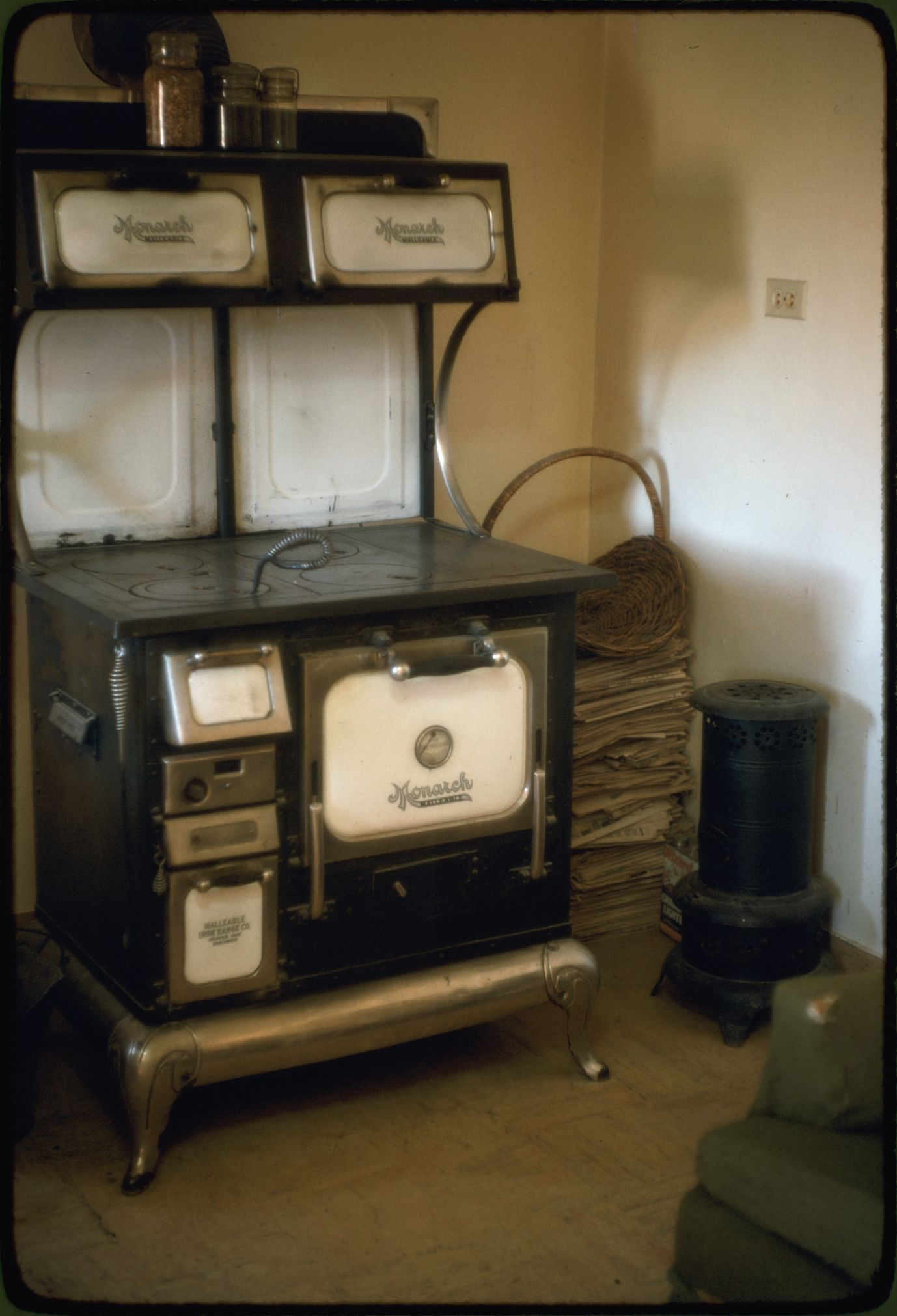
Monarch vintage wood stove

After World War I, building construction projects resumed. In 1920, additions to the enameling building and a new foundry were built. In 1925 and 1926 a warehouse, and sections joining existing buildings, were constructed. By 1928 additions on the south end of the property provided more space for manufacturing electric ranges as well as warehouse, office, and storage space. An experimental and teaching kitchen was included in this addition. By 1929 the plant consisted of 26 individual departments and more than 400,000 square feet of floor space. The plant was producing more than 300 various styles and models of four types of cooking devices: coal/wood, electric, gas and combinations of any two of those types. In addition to domestic equipment, commercial ranges were produced for restaurants, hotels and other institutions.

The ranges were being sold though more than 4,500 retail locations, including hardware dealers, furniture dealers and utility companies.

In 1924, Monarch was visited by Samuel Insull, regarding the development of an electric range to be sold by his conglomeration of electric utilities under the Federal Electric name. Ten of thousands of these Fedelco electric ranges were shipped until Insull's highly leveraged holding companies collapsed in 1931. There were other appliances, such as wash machines made by ABC Washer, clothing irons, and vacuum cleaners, that were also sold under the Fedelco name. The line of electric ranges was changed to a Monarch line and were continued to be sold by the same electric utilities. The Public Utility Holding Company Act of 1935 effectively broke up these pyramid style monopolies.

In 1927–28, Fred Rogers, who was the current president of the company, built a five-story hotel to cater to the salesmen that frequently visited the city. An additional floor was added in 1930. This building was operated as a hotel by his daughter, Anne Rogers Pfeffer, until 1987. This building is still known as the Hotel Rogers and has been remodeled and is currently operated as an apartment building.

In 1934 Admiral Richard E. Byrd visited Beaver Dam and assisted in designing a Monarch coal-wood stove to be used in his second Antarctic expedition. He subsequently ordered an oil stove for his third Antarctic expedition. Both stoves were used in all of his following expeditions.

Additional product lines were developed and produced including refrigerators, gas and electric water heaters. New porcelain, enamel, and chrome departments were added as the company grew.

By 1941 the company had about 800 employees.

=== 1946–1985 ===
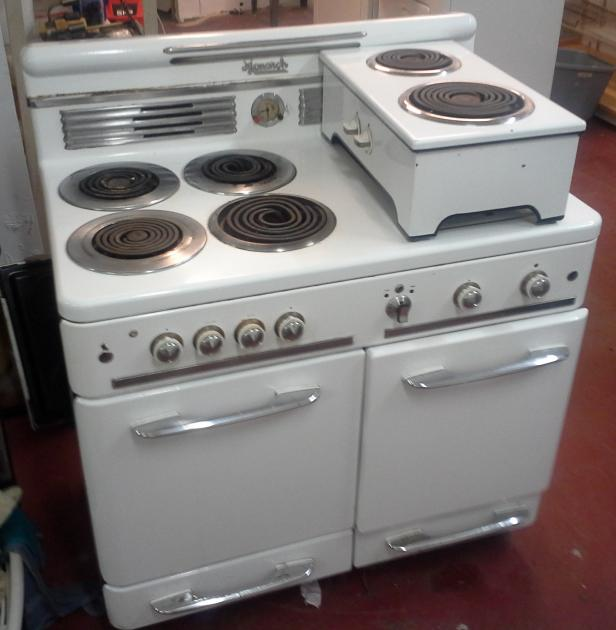
Typical 1950's vintage Monarch Electric Range

After the Second World War, production of residential appliances was resumed and the factory ran at near full capacity until 1948 when the delayed demand was satisfied.

Employment peaked in the mid-1950s at about 1,200.

In the 1950s and 1960s, many advances were made in kitchen ranges. Although Monarch kept pace with the changes, the company suffered difficulty due to the fact that a large percentage of its products were sold through electric utility companies. During the 1960s, most of these utility companies decided to give up appliance merchandising as a means of increasing electricity consumption. Most of this marketing was discontinued by 1970. As a small company, Monarch found that it did not have the marketing strength to compete against the large appliance manufactures such as General Electric.

Among the advances made in ranges was the development of the convection oven. Malleable was the first manufacturer to install a circulating fan in an oven designed for home use in 1967.

Oil shortages in the mid-1970s gave the company some increase in sales of its Add-a-Furnace wood-burning furnaces. These furnaces were designed to be connected to existing furnaces as a supplementary, or replacement, heat source for oil. However, by 1979 oil was again plentiful and new local ordinances were commonly prohibiting the burning of wood and coal. In 1980 the company was still introducing new central-heating related products for burning and was reporting an increase in sales of those products. By 1985, the Malleable Iron Range Company had a workforce of only about 260 persons.

=== Bankruptcy ===
In March 1985, the Malleable Iron Range Company filed for bankruptcy protection with assets of $7 million and debts of $5.8 million. In July, 1985, the assets, excluding buildings and land, were purchased for $2.36 million by the Famco Machine Division of Belco Industries of Kenosha, Wisconsin. Production was very slow, and there were only about 50 employees working at the plant.

A new company was formed, named Monarch Appliance and Fabricating Company (MAFCO), and assets and production were moved to Algoma, Wisconsin, within three months.

In May 1987, MAFCO was purchased by the Metal Ware Corporation of Two Rivers, Wisconsin, and the name was changed to Monarch Ware, Inc.

Monarch Ware last operated in 2003 at a plant located at 340 North Water Street, Algoma, Wisconsin, and was in the business of metal stamping and enameling.

The registered trades names for Monarch and Jet Fan were last assigned to the Metal Ware Corporation, Inc., of Two Rivers, Wisconsin. Metal Ware is the current manufacturer of Nesco brand kitchen appliances.

=== Brownfield and site redevelopment ===
An inspection at the plant in 1986 discovered 500 barrels of toxic and hazardous wastes, 65,000 gallons of dangerous materials—including flammable paint thinner, stripper waste, electroplating solutions, lab chemicals, porcelain enamel waste with high concentrations of heavy metals—and an assortment of barrels of unlisted contents. Attempts were made to get the receivers of the company to remove the asbestos and other hazardous wastes from the site. The Environmental Protection Agency (EPA) became involved. EPA used $369,000 from the Superfund program to pay for removing wastes during the summer of 1987.

In 1988, the Beaver Dam property was given to Dodge County, Wisconsin, in bankruptcy court proceedings in lieu of delinquent property taxes.

On February 16, 1990, a fire was set by an arsonist in a building on the south side of the property doing considerable damage. Part of the buildings were razed during the fire to contain the blaze. The cost to the county to fight the fire was $359,000. Due to the damage and continuing problems with trespassing and vandalism, the buildings were all razed in 1990.

During the next several years, Dodge County hired an environmental consulting firm; submitted a site assessment to DNR; installed a system for dealing with petroleum contamination; cleaned up and disposed of contaminated soils; and put together a remedial action plan for removing non-petroleum products from groundwater. The effort cost the county nearly $1.5 million. The city of Beaver Dam created a tax increment financing (TIF) District in September 1994 for development on the property, and contributed $350,000 toward environmental clean-up costs. The state provided some financial assistance as well. Dodge County received $657,000 from the state PECFA (Petroleum Environmental Clean-Up Fund Act) to clean up groundwater pollution caused by underground tanks. And the state Department of Development awarded Beaver Dam a $350,000 block grant for improvements, including street, sewer and water utilities, engineering and site work.

Clean-up costs for the entire property totaled $2.6 million.

In August 1995 construction was started on a building to house a grocery store.

== War production ==
During World War I, the company developed portable coal-wood field ranges for use by the American Expeditionary Forces in Europe.

During World War II, the Malleable Iron Range Company produced 75mm artillery shells, truck bodies, and gas and water cans. Although US home appliance manufacturing was shut down early in the war, in 1943 the Defense department ordered 1,000, 20-inch, apartment sized electric ranges. These were shipped to Oak Ridge, Tennessee for use by workers in the Manhattan Project. On April 17, 1943, U.S. Undersecretary of War announced the Malleable Iron Range Co. had won the Army-Navy "E" Award. By war's end four white stars for quality and quantity produced had been added to the award pennant. In February, 1945 the War Production Board authorized the company to produce 3,750 electric ranges.

During the Korean War an additional property was acquired and a plant was constructed for the production of M-323 artillery shells. Shells were made from 1951 to 1953. Total production was over 1 million shells. (Photos)

== Products ==
- Monarch coal-wood ranges
- Monarch electric ranges
- Paramount gas ranges
- Electric water heaters
- Monarch refrigerators
- Convection ovens
- Circulating heaters
- Add-a-furnaces
- Room heaters

== Related companies and successors ==
- Dauntless Stove Manufacturing Company
- Dauntless Steel Range Company
- MAFCO, INC., 340 N. Water Street, Algoma, Wisconsin 54021
- Empire Products, Inc., 340 N. Water Street, Algoma, Wisconsin 54201
- Monarch Ware, Inc. Algoma, Wisconsin
- Metal Ware Corporation, Inc., Two Rivers, Wisconsin

== Patents and trademarks ==
As is common with many corporations, the Malleable Iron range company applied for and was granted numerous patents for its products over the course of its existence.

=== Utility patents ===
1. U.S. patent 839,622 Stove Draft Apparatus - 25 Dec 1906
2. U.S. patent 929,103 Heater - 27 Jul 1909
3. U.S. patent 965,334 Stove-top - 26 Jul 1910
4. U.S. patent 1,056,061 Process for Welding dissimilar metals - 18 Mar 1913
5. U.S. patent 1,071,561 Stove - 26 Aug 1913
6. U.S. patent 1,400,558 Combination coal and gas range - 20 Dec 1921
7. U.S. patent 1,413,990 Latch for oven doors - 25 Apr 1922
8. U.S. patent 1,472,725 Thermostatic mechanism - 30 Oct 1923
9. U.S. patent 1,550,096 Gas Range - 27 Jul 1926
10. U.S. patent 1,593,777 Closed-top gas range - 27 Jul 1926
11. U.S. patent 1,700,597 Range Construction - 29 Jan 1929
12. U.S. patent 1,784,753 Electric oven construction - 9 Dec 1930
13. U.S. patent 1,812,609 Separable electric connector - 30 Jun 1931
14. U.S. patent 1,855,759 Range - 26 Apr 1932
15. U.S. patent 1,863,273 Water heater - 14 Jun 1932
16. U.S. patent 2,074,985 Electric Cooker - 23 Mar 1937
17. U.S. patent 2,097,977 Range - 2 Nov 1937
18. U.S. patent 2,133,184 Combination Coal-Wood-Electric Range - 11 Oct 1938
19. U.S. patent 2,147,331 Combination Range - 14 Feb 1939
20. U.S. patent 2,641,244 Combination Range - 9 Jun 1953
21. U.S. patent 2,731,011 Stove Construction - 17 Jan 1956
22. U.S. patent 3,169,517 Cooking Range of the Sliding Drawer Type - 16 Feb 1965
23. U.S. patent 3,414,708 Forced convection oven - 3 Dec 1968
24. U.S. patent 3,495,582 Removable Door Construction for Ovens -
25. U.S. patent 4,180,051 Furnace - 25 Dec 1979 (also Canada 1,102,645)

=== Design patents ===
1. U.S. patent D93221 Design for a range
2. U.S. patent D94486 Range with Clock and Condiment Holder
3. U.S. patent D99265 Combination Coal and Gas Range
4. U.S. patent D108114 Design for a Range
5. U.S. patent D110762 Design for a Cooking Stove
6. U.S. patent D163761 Range
7. U.S. patent D192717 Cooking Range
8. U.S. patent D195110 Cooking Range

=== Registered trademarks ===
- Monarch

U.S. Trademark 71,022,652 - 1906
U.S. Trademark 71,295,075 - 1930
U.S. Trademark 71,318,815 - 1931
U.S. Trademark 72,277,680 - 1967
U.S. Trademark 73,244,184 - 1979

- Paramount

U.S. Trademark 71,247,090 - 1937

- Vitrifused

U.S. Trademark 71,145,698 - 1921

- Jet-Fan

U.S. Trademark 73,015,183 - 1974
U.S. Trademark 74,646,858 (Metal Ware Corporation, Inc.) - 1995

- Add-a-Furnace

U.S. Trademark 73,138,013 - 1977

=== Other brand names ===
- Fedelco
- Convert-A-Fireplace

== Notable employee ==
Fred MacMurray
