= Wisconsin's 39th Assembly district =

American legislative district in central Wisconsin

Wisconsin's 39th State Assembly district
- 2024 map defined in 2023 Wisc. Act 94; 2022 map defined in Johnson v. Wisconsin Elections Commission; 2011 map was defined in 2011 Wisc. Act 43
Assemblymember
| Alex Dallman; R–Green Lake |
since January 6, 2025 (1 years)
- Demographics: 91.45% White; 1.9% Black; 3.84% Hispanic; 0.74% Asian; 1.67% Native American; 0.13% Hawaiian/Pacific Islander
- Population (2020) • Voting age: 59,796; 47,563
- Website: Official website
- Notes: Central Wisconsin

The 39th Assembly district of Wisconsin is one of 99 districts in the Wisconsin State Assembly. Located in central Wisconsin, the district comprises all of Green Lake and Marquette counties, along with much of western Fond du Lac County and parts of northeast Columbia County, southeast Winnebago County, and eastern Adams County. It includes the cities of Berlin, Green Lake, Markesan, Montello, Princeton, and Ripon. The district also contains Fox River National Wildlife Refuge, Summerton Bog, Ripon College and the historic Little White Schoolhouse in Ripon—the birthplace of the Republican Party. The district is represented by Republican Alex Dallman, since January 2025; Dallman previously represented the 41st district from 2021 to 2025.

The 39th Assembly district is located within Wisconsin's 13th Senate district, along with the 37th and 38th Assembly districts.

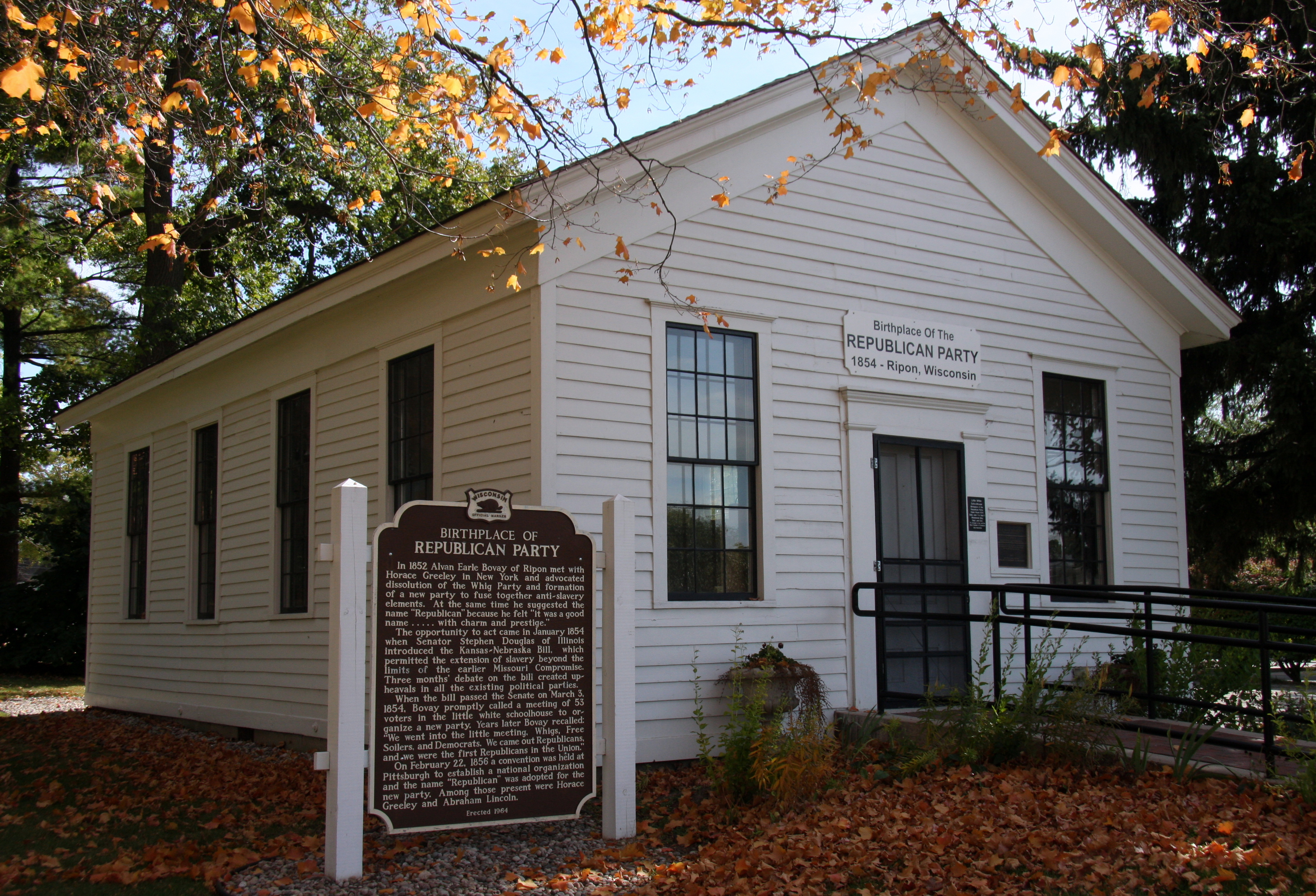
Little White Schoolhouse, birthplace of the Republican Party

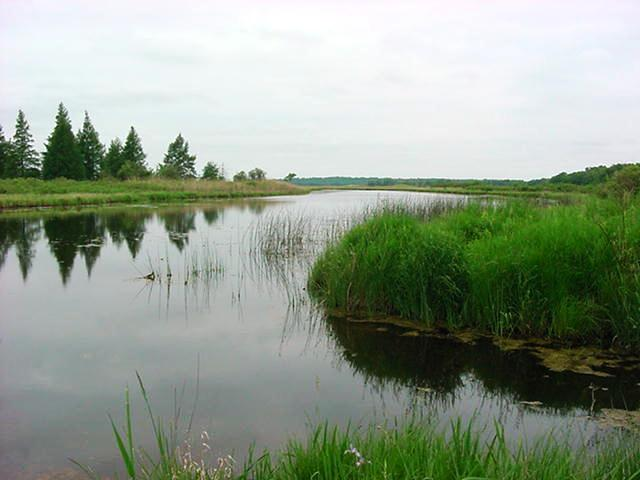
Fox River National Wildlife Refuge

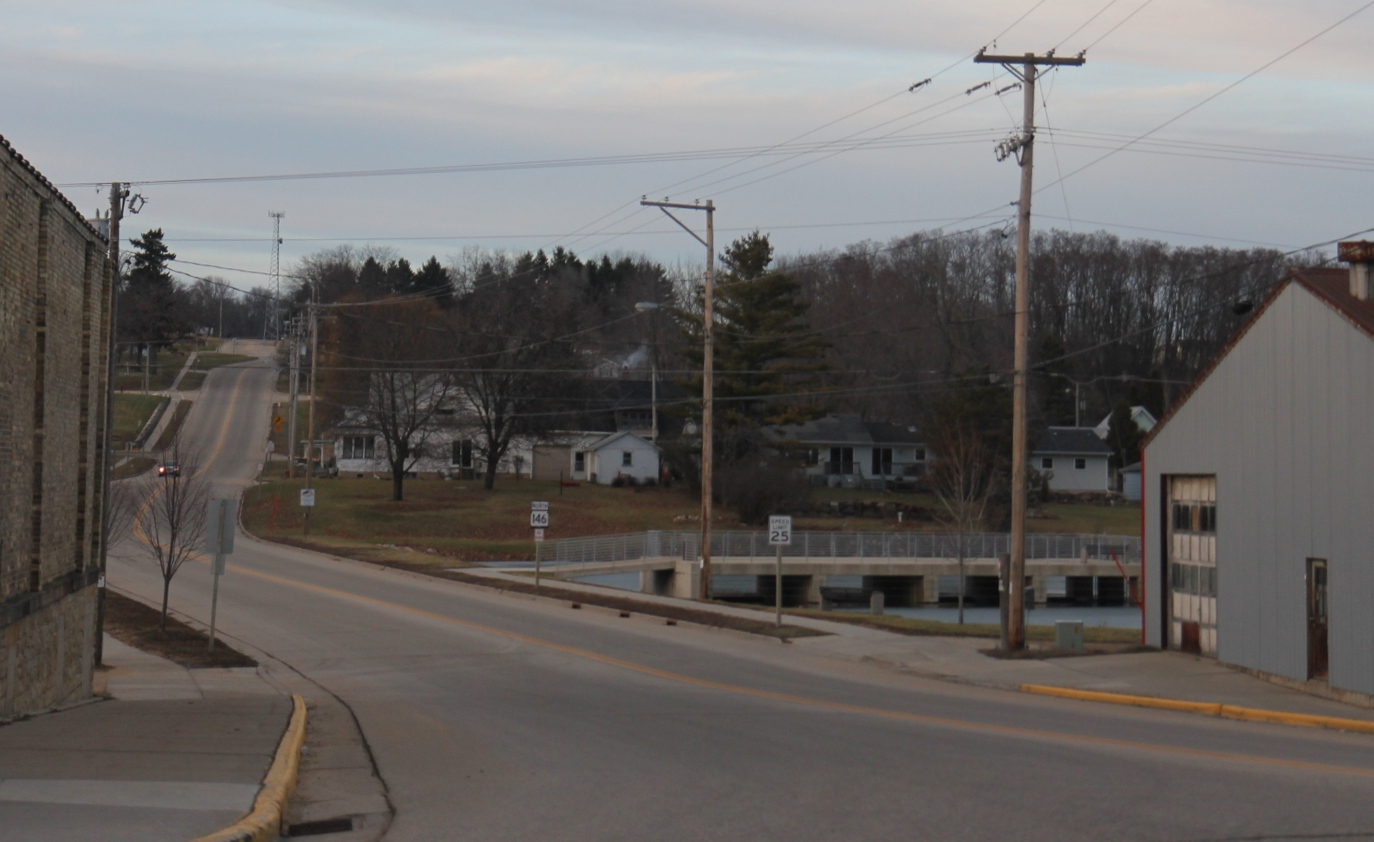
Cambria

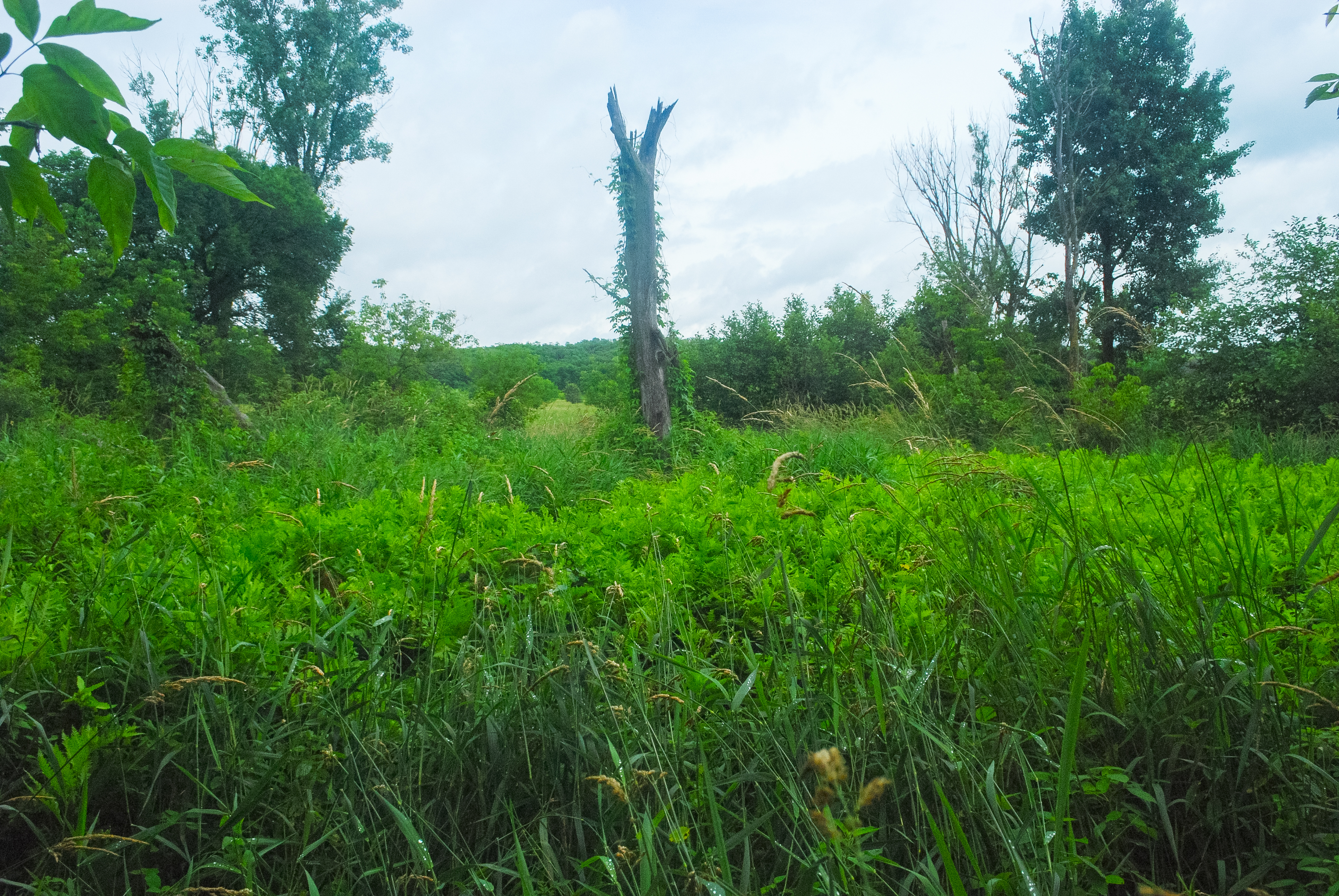
Summerton Bog

== History ==
The district was created in the 1972 redistricting act (1971 Wisc. Act 304) which first established the numbered district system, replacing the previous system which allocated districts to specific counties. The 39th district was drawn with novel boundaries in central Jefferson County. Under the previous apportionment scheme, Jefferson County as a whole constituted an Assembly district. The last representative of the Jefferson County district, Byron F. Wackett, was elected in 1972 as the first representative of the 39th Assembly district.

Following the 1982 court-ordered redistricting, which scrambled all State Assembly districts, the 1983 redistricting moved the 39th district to Dodge County. The district has remained in the same area since 1983, with variations in the boundaries.

Notable former representatives of the 39th district include Jeff Fitzgerald, who was the 78th Speaker of the Wisconsin State Assembly, and was instrumental in the passage of the controversial 2011 Wisconsin Act 10, which resulted in months of protests and, eventually, several recall elections.

== List of past representatives ==
List of representatives to the Wisconsin State Assembly from the 39th district
| Member | Party | Residence | Counties represented | Term start | Term end | Ref. |
|---|---|---|---|---|---|---|
District created
| Byron F. Wackett | Rep. | Watertown | Jefferson, Walworth | January 1, 1973 | January 3, 1977 | |
| Milton Lorman | Rep. | Fort Atkinson | Jefferson, Walworth | January 3, 1977 | November 27, 1979 | |
| --Vacant-- | | | Jefferson, Walworth | November 27, 1979 | February 7, 1980 | |
| Randall S. Knox | Rep. | Jefferson | Jefferson, Walworth | February 7, 1980 | January 3, 1983 | |
| Robert S. Travis Jr. | Rep. | Platteville | Grant, Richland | January 3, 1983 | January 7, 1985 | |
| Robert Goetsch | Rep. | Oak Grove | Columbia, Dodge | January 7, 1985 | January 1, 2001 | |
| Jeff Fitzgerald | Rep. | Horicon | Dodge | January 1, 2001 | January 7, 2013 | |
| Mark Born | Rep. | Beaver Dam | Dodge, Washington | January 7, 2013 | January 6, 2025 | |
| Mark Born | Rep. | Beaver Dam | Columbia, Dodge | January 7, 2013 | January 6, 2025 | |
| Alex Dallman | Rep. | Green Lake | Adams, Columbia, Green Lake, Fond du Lac, Marquette | January 6, 2025 | Current | |
