= Milton Lorman =

American politician (1927–1979)

Member of the Wisconsin State Assembly from the 39th district
- In office January 3, 1977 – November 27, 1979
- Preceded by: Byron F. Wackett
- Succeeded by: Randall S. Knox

Personal details
- Born: July 27, 1927 Fort Atkinson, Wisconsin, U.S.
- Died: November 27, 1979 (aged 52) China House Restaurant, 1256 S. Park St., Madison, Wisconsin
- Cause of death: Heart attack
- Resting place: Forest Hill Cemetery, Madison, Wisconsin
- Party: Republican
- Spouse: Barbara Ann Kailin (m. 1953–1979)
- Children: 3
- Education: University of Wisconsin–Madison (B.B.A., LL.B., J.D.)
- Occupation: politician

Military service
- Allegiance: United States
- Branch/service: United States Navy; United States Army; U.S. Army Reserve
- Years of service: 1945–1946 (USN); 1953–1969 (USAR)
- Rank: Seaman 1st Class, USN; Captain, USAR

Milton Lorman (July 27, 1927 – November 27, 1979) was an American attorney, businessman, and Republican politician. He was elected to two terms in the Wisconsin State Assembly, representing Jefferson County, but died in office during his second term.

== Early life and education ==
Born in Fort Atkinson, Wisconsin, Lorman graduated from Fort Atkinson High School and enlisted in the United States Navy, serving two years. On his return to private life, he attended the University of Wisconsin–Madison, where he earned his bachelor's degree in 1950. He continued his education there and also received an LL.B. in 1953. While studying at the University of Wisconsin, Lorman joined the Reserve Officers' Training Corps and was commissioned in the United States Army Reserve in 1953. He continued to serve in the Army Reserves until 1969, rising to the rank of captain.

== Career ==
After being admitted to the State Bar of Wisconsin, he was hired as an assistant district attorney in Jefferson County, under D.A. Thorpe Merriman. He also became an active partner with his father in a metal salvage and scrap company, known as Lorman Iron and Metal Co. He ultimately succeeded his father as president of the company.

In 1958, he was appointed to the Fort Atkinson Police and Fire Commission, and, in 1960, was elected municipal judge, where he served until his election to the Assembly in 1976. In 1972, he was also appointed to the South Central Criminal Justice Regional Planning Council by Governor Patrick Lucey.

On the retirement of state representative Byron F. Wackett, Lorman entered the race to replace him in the Wisconsin State Assembly. Despite Wackett endorsing the other candidate in the Republican primary, John Neis, Lorman won the primary in a landslide, carrying more than 70% of the vote. He went on to win nearly 60% in the general election, defeating Democrat Lawrence Wiedenfeld. He would win reelection without opposition in 1978, but died in November 1979.

Lorman was considered a moderate in the Assembly Republican caucus, an early supporter of Lee S. Dreyfus—a dark horse Republican candidate who won the governorship in 1978. As the son of refugees, he was vocal about the plight of the "boat people"—refugees from the wars in Vietnam and Cambodia—and fought for their resettlement in Wisconsin.

== Personal life and family ==
Lorman was the son of Louis R. Lorman and his wife, Clara Lorman (née Wolach). His parents were Russian American Jews who fled the Soviet Union and emigrated to the United States.

Milton Lorman married Barbara Kailin at Madison's Beth El Temple, February 1, 1953. They had three children together. Lorman died of a sudden heart attack while dining at a restaurant on Madison's south side, November 27, 1979.

Outside of his political activity, Lorman was a member and past president of the Wisconsin Chapter of the Institute of Scrap Iron and Steel, a member of the National Association of Recycling Industries, Lions Clubs International, Masons, the American Legion, and the Fort Atkinson Symphony. He was also an active member of the Madison Jewish Welfare Council for many years.

Wisconsin State Assembly
Preceded by Byron F. Wackett	Member of the Wisconsin State Assembly from the 39th district January 3, 1977 – November 27, 1979	Succeeded by Randall S. Knox
