= Sterr =

Sterr is a surname. Notable people with the surname include:

- Gil Sterr, American football player
- Hans Sterr (1933–2011), German wrestler
- Heinrich Sterr (1919–1944), German World War II flying ace
