= Randall Herbst =

American college basketball coach

Current position
- Title: Head coach
- Team: Minot State
- Conference: NSIC
- Record: 16–20 (.444)

Playing career
- 1989–1991: Waldorf
- 1991–1993: Winona State

Coaching career (HC unless noted)
- 1993–1997: North Iowa Area CC (assistant)
- 1997–1998: Lincoln Memorial (assistant)
- 1998–2000: Waldorf
- 2000–2006: North Dakota (assistant)
- 2006–2007: Florida Southern (assistant)
- 2007–2009: Omaha (assistant)
- 2009–2011: UMary
- 2011–2015: Omaha (assistant)
- 2015–2020: Green Bay (assistant)
- 2020–2022: Minot State (assistant)
- 2022–2025: North Dakota (assistant)
- 2025–present: Minot State

Head coaching record
- Overall: 88–66 (.571)
- Tournaments: 0–1 (NCAA DII)

Accomplishments and honors

Awards
- Waldorf University Hall of Fame; Beaver Dam High School Hall of Fame

Randall Herbst is an American college basketball coach, currently the head men's basketball coach at Minot State University.

== Early life ==
Herbst attended Beaver Dam High School in Beaver Dam, Wisconsin. He then went on to play collegiate basketball and baseball at Waldorf Junior College (now Waldorf University). In 1991 he was named as Waldorf's Male Athlete of the Year and also as an academic All-American. He then went on to attend Winona State University in Winona, Minnesota, where he also played basketball and baseball. While there he helped led the Warriors to the semifinal round of the 1992 NAIA World Series. Herbst graduated from Winona State University in 1993 with a degree in physical education.

== Coaching career ==
Herbst's first coaching opportunity came at North Iowa Area Community College in Mason City, Iowa, where he spent four seasons as an assistant coach. While there he helped lead the Trojans to the 1995 NJCAA Division II men's basketball championship. He then spent one season as an assistant at Lincoln Memorial University in Harrogate, Tennessee before receiving his first collegiate head coaching job at Waldorf Junior College in 1998. He spent two seasons with the Warriors, compiling an overall record of 34–27.

Herbst was then hired as an assistant coach at the University of North Dakota in Grand Forks, North Dakota under head coach Rich Glas. While there he helped coach Jerome Beasley, who was drafted in the 2nd round of the 2003 NBA Draft by the Miami Heat. After Glas left to be an assistant coach at the University of Northern Iowa, Herbst left and spent one season as an assistant at Florida Southern College in Lakeland, Florida. He then spent two season as an assistant coach under Derrin Hansen at the University of Nebraska Omaha in Omaha, Nebraska.

Herbst received his second head coaching opportunity in 2009 when he was hired to be the head coach at the University of Mary in Bismarck, North Dakota. He spent two seasons with the Marauders, compiling an overall record of 38–19 (29–13 in the NSIC). During the 2010–11 season, Herbst led the Marauders to a 23–6 overall record (18–4 in the NSIC) and finished second in the Northern Sun Intercollegiate Conference.

In 2011, Herbst returned to the University of Nebraska Omaha as an assistant coach. He helped lead the Mavericks as they made the transition to Division I and joined The Summit League. Then, in 2015, he was hired as an assistant coach at the University of Wisconsin–Green Bay in Green Bay, Wisconsin. While there he helped lead the Phoenix to win the 2016 Horizon League tournament and make the program's first appearance in the NCAA Tournament in 20 years. In 2020, Herbst was hired as an assistant coach at Minot State University in Minot, North Dakota. He spent two seasons with the Beavers before returning to the University of North Dakota to be an assistant coach under Paul Sather.

On May 19, 2025, it was announced that Herbst was hired as the next head coach at Minot State University who compete as members of the Northern Sun Intercollegiate Conference.

== Head coaching record ==
Record table
Season	Team	Overall	Conference	Standing	Postseason
Waldorf () (1998–2000)
1998–99	Waldorf	19–12			
1999–00	Waldorf	15–15			
Waldorf:		34–27 (.557)			
UMary (NSIC) (2009–2011)
2009–10	UMary	15–13	11–9	5th	
2010–11	UMary	23–6	18–4	2nd	NCAA DII first round
UMary:		38–19 (.667)	29–13 (.690)		
Minot State (NSIC) (2025–present)
2025–26	Minot State	12–17	9–13	12th / 5th (North)	
2026–27	Minot State	4–3	0–0		
Minot State:		16–20 (.444)	9–13 (.409)		
Total:		88–66 (.571)			
National champion Postseason invitational champion Conference regular season champion Conference regular season and conference tournament champion Division regular season champion Division regular season and conference tournament champion Conference tournament champion

== Personal life ==
Herbst graduated from Minnesota State University, Mankato in 2005 with a master's degree in sports administration. He has a wife named Kari and two children named Liza and Jude.
