= Dodge County Fair =

County fair of Dodge County, Wisconsin

Coordinates: 43.4426333335752°N 88.75760411364604°W

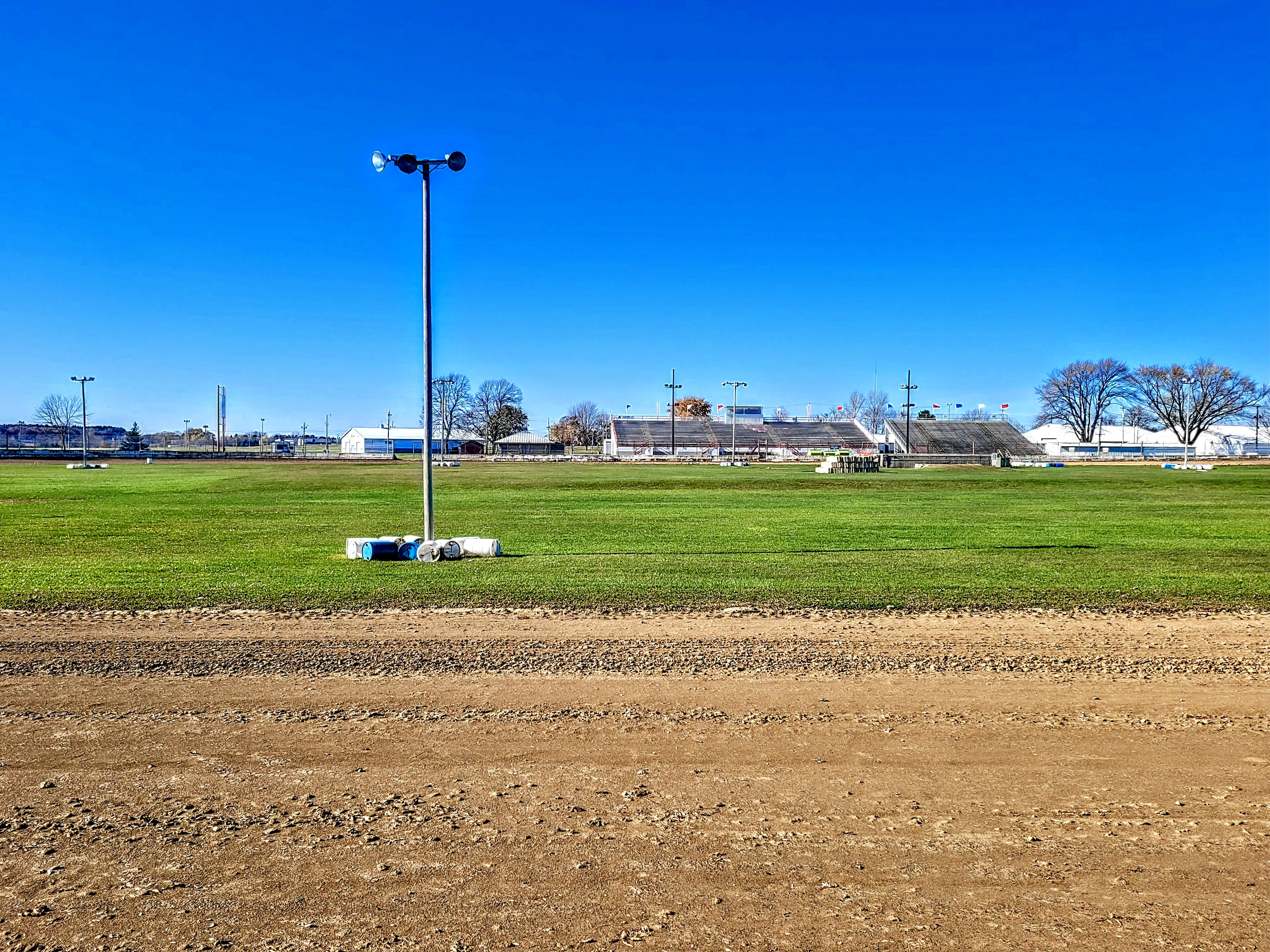
- Genre: Fair
- Frequency: Annually
- Venue: Dodge County Fairgrounds
- Participants: 50,000 (estimated)

The Dodge County Fair is the annual county fair held in Dodge County, Wisconsin. The fair is held every year in August starting from the 3rd Wednesday of the month through the following Sunday at the Dodge County Fairgrounds.

The first Dodge County Fair was held in the fall of 1853 in Juneau. For the next three decades the location of the fair was in Juneau with the exception of the county fairs of 1855 and 1874 which were held in Beaver Dam, and the fair of 1856 which was held at Horicon.

On October 5, 1887, the fair was held in Beaver Dam at grounds which are now part of the Wayland Academy.

In 1961, the Dodge County Fair Association moved the fair to the newly purchased fairgrounds along Highway 33, east of Beaver Dam which serves as the present day location for the fair. The site is known as the Dodge County Fairgrounds.

The fair features food festivals, music concerts, livestock shows and other entertainment activities and is attended by over 50000 people annually.
