= Barney Traynor =

American football player and coach (1894–1980)

Profile
- Position: Center

Personal information
- Born: November 24, 1894; Beaver Dam, Wisconsin, U.S.
- Died: August 26, 1980 (aged 85); Austin, Texas, U.S.
- Listed height: 6 ft 1 in (1.85 m)
- Listed weight: 190 lb (86 kg)

Career information
- High school: South Division (Milwaukee, Wisconsin)
- College: Colgate

Career history

Playing
- Milwaukee Badgers (1925)

Coaching
- Wisconsin (1923–1925) Line coach; Michigan State (1926) Line coach
- Stats at Pro Football Reference

Bernard Philip "Barney" Traynor (November 24, 1894 – August 26, 1980) was an American football player and coach. He played professionally in the National Football League (NFL) for the Milwaukee Badgers in 1925 as a center. Traynor played college football at Colgate University.

Traynor was born on November 24, 1896, in Beaver Dam, Wisconsin. In 1923, he was hired as an assistant football coach at the University of Wisconsin under head coach John J. Ryan. He served as line coach at Wisconsin for two seasons, in 1923 and 1924. Traynor was appointed an assistant football coach at Michigan State College—now known as Michigan State University—in 1926 under head coach and athletic director Ralph H. Young. In 1926, Traynor wrote a lyric to music by Gaetano Donizetti, the Sextet from his opera, Lucia di Lammermoor, which is now the Michigan State alma mater, MSU Shadows. In 1928, he enrolled the University of Michigan Law School.
