= Stella B. Irvine =

American temperance advocate, educator, writer, leader, political candidate (1859–1926)

Rev. Stella B. Irvine
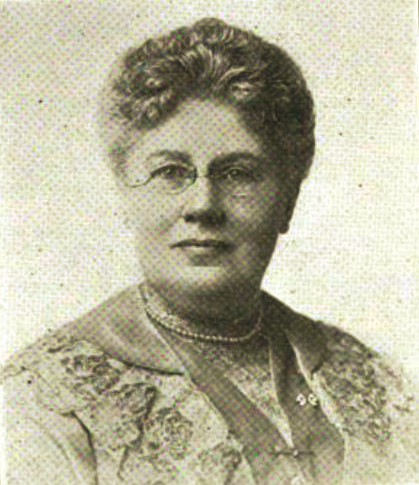
- Portrait from Standard Encyclopedia of the Alcohol Problem (1926)
- Born: Estella Blanchard; July 21, 1859; Beaver Dam, Wisconsin, U.S.
- Died: November 26, 1926 (aged 67); Riverside, California, U.S.
- Occupations: temperance advocate; educator; writer; leader; political candidate
- Organization: Woman's Christian Temperance Union
- Political party: Prohibition
- Movement: temperance; prohibition
- Spouse: Lewis Ward Irvine (m. 1882)

Rev. Stella B. Irvine (née, Blanchard; 1859–1926) was a pioneer in the American temperance and prohibition movements. She served as President of the Southern California Woman's Christian Temperance Union (WCTU), as well as National and World WCTU Director of the Sunday School Department. She wrote a great deal of literature on behalf of prohibition. Her writings and teachings were utilized for many years in Sunday schools and organizations for the education of young people throughout the U.S. She also organized the first Sunday school teachers' training class in the U.S. (1906). Irvine was a Prohibition Party candidate for the California State Assembly (1914) and the United States House of Representatives (1918).

== Early life and education ==
Estella (nickname, "Stella") Blanchard was born at Beaver Dam, Wisconsin, July 21, 1859. Her parents were Lorenzo Dow Blanchard (b. 1838) and Almira (Johnson) (1839–1906) Blanchard. Stella's siblings were Annette and Isabella.

After living at Beaver Dam several years, she was taken with her family to La Crosse, Wisconsin, where she attended school and met her future husband.

== Career ==
Early on, Irvine was recognized as a specialist in teaching and in teacher training. For a time, she was engaged in teaching at La Crosse, Wisconsin. Always of a religious turn of mind, Irvine had from her childhood been devoted to Sunday school work.

On June 20, 1882, at Portage, Wisconsin, she married Lewis Ward Irvine (1857–1931). They made their home in Saint Paul, Minnesota where Mr. Irvine managed a feed and commission business.

Later, they moved to South Dakota and it was at that time that Mrs. Irvine began the temperance work. In 1884, she joined the WCTU. After living in South Dakota some years, the Irvines returned to St. Paul, and shortly after that, Mrs. Irvine was made an officer in the Wisconsin State WCTU.

In the winter of 1893, the Irvines came to Riverside, California to make their home, where Mr. Irvine owned several orange groves. A few years later, they built an imposing residence, Stel-Lew-Vine, at 115 Walnut Street.

In 1894, she was elected National Superintendent of the Sunday School Department of the National WCTU, and by 1926, promoted to National Director of the Department. Possessing literary ability, initiative, and persistence, she created and conducted a Bureau of Sunday School Temperance Literature, which handled more than 500 publications, reaching many of the Sunday schools of Europe as well as those of the U.S. In 1900, at the Convention of the World's WCTU, held at Edinburgh, Scotland, she was elected Associate World Superintendent of the Sunday School Department; and at the Convention held in London, England, in 1922, she was elected Superintendent of the same Department.

In 1902, Irvine served for several years as State Superintendent of the Temperance Department of the Southern California WCTU, and under her leadership as "war president" the Union had five years of unprecedented success along many lines of work.

In 1914, the Southern California White Ribbon published a "Stella B. Irvine Appreciation Number". The same year, Irvine was the Prohibition Party candidate for the California State Assembly, and four years later, she competed in the 1918 U.S. House of Representatives elections in California representing California's 11th congressional district. Though she performed well in both elections, she won neither. Her object was to educate the people, and the outcome was the election of four women to the succeeding California State Legislature. She led the women of her State in three campaigns for State Prohibition and for the ratification of the Eighteenth Amendment to the U.S. Constitution.

It was through Irvine's efforts that the World's Temperance Sunday was established, and that a temperance lesson was presented once a quarter in the Sunday schools throughout the world.

In the religious field, Irvine was the second woman to be licensed as a local preacher in the Southern California Conference of the Methodist Episcopal Church. After pursuing the required course of study, she was ordanined in October 1926. Irvine was officially connected with the International Association of Women Preachers. She also organized the first Sunday school teachers' training class in the U.S. (First Methodist Church, Riverside, California, 1906).

In 1917, she served on the Vivisection Committee of the California Humanitarian League.

== Death ==
After suffering from a heart ailment for five years, Stella B. Irvine died in Riverside, California, November 26, 1926.

== Selected works ==
=== Books ===
- Supplemental temperance lessons, primary department, 1903
- Supplemental temperance lessons, junior grade, 1903
- Supplemental temperance lessons, senior grade, 1903
- Notes of victory; program for temperance Sunday, 1903
- Mortgaged life, 1910
- Cigarette fortune-teller, 1911

=== Articles ===
- "A biographical sketch of Frances E. Willard", Onward, 1912

=== Songs ===
- Song of the temperance fairies; words and music by Stella B. Irvine, 1903

== See also ==
- Women in the United States Prohibition movement
