= David C. Gowdey =

American politician

David Campbell Gowdey (August 3, 1841 – December 27, 1908) was a member of the Wisconsin State Assembly.

== Biography ==
Gowdey was born on August 3, 1841, in New York City. He later moved to Beaver Dam, Wisconsin, and in 1885 he moved to Hurley, Wisconsin, where he established the newspaper the Montreal River Miner. He moved to Mineral Wells, Texas, in 1893. He died in San Antonio in 1908 and was buried at Odd Fellows Cemetery in the city.

== Career ==
Gowdey was a member of the Assembly during the 1874 Session. Previously, he was City Clerk of Beaver Dam in 1866, 1867, 1869, 1871 and 1872. He was a Democrat.
