= Columbus Germain =

American politician

Columbus Germain (January 14, 1827 – October 8, 1880) was an American politician.

Born in Rush, New York, Germain moved to Milwaukee, Wisconsin Territory in 1843, where he operated a ferry. He then relocated to Fox Lake, Wisconsin in 1846 and settled in Beaver Dam, Wisconsin in 1847. Germain was a carpenter, owned a livery stable, and worked for the railroad. Germain was sheriff of Dodge County in 1862 and 1866. Germain was sergeant at arms for the Wisconsin State Assembly in 1874 and served in the Wisconsin State Assembly in 1876 as a Democrat.

During his time as sheriff, he was shot while pursuing two suspects into Vernon County; a bullet remained lodged in his lungs, which reportedly contributed to his death after he fell ill during a business trip to Minnesota in 1878. He died at his home in Beaver Dam, Wisconsin. He was serving on the Beaver Dam Common Council at the time of his death.
