= Williams Free Library =

- U.S. National Register of Historic Places
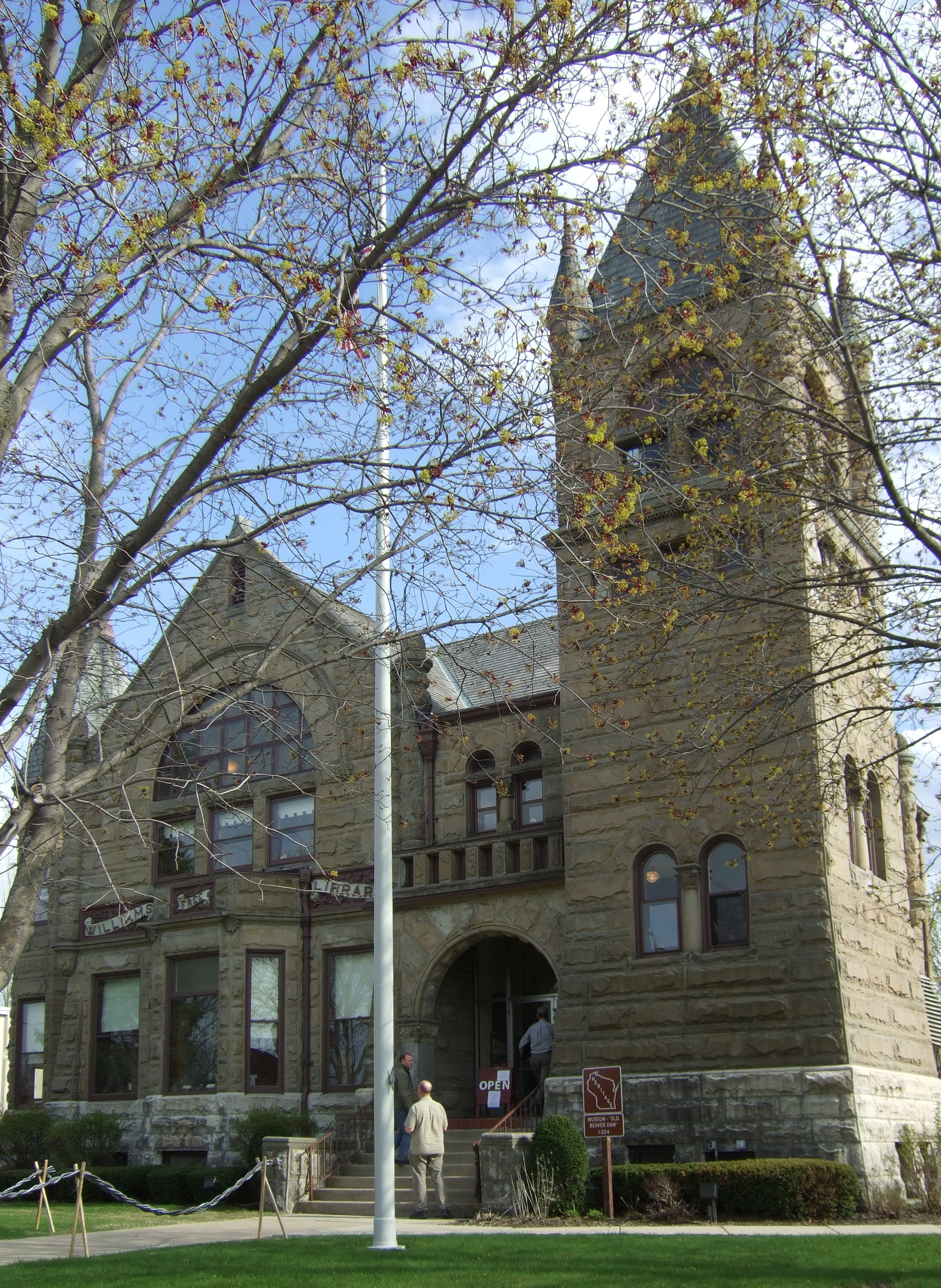

- Location within Wisconsin
- Interactive map showing the location of Williams Free Library
- Location: 105 Park Ave. Beaver Dam, Wisconsin
- Coordinates: 43°27′21″N 88°50′12″W
- Architect: Walter Holbrook
- NRHP reference No.: 74000079
- Added to NRHP: August 7, 1974

The Williams Free Library is a public building in Beaver Dam, Wisconsin. It was the first public library in the United States to have open stacks. In 1985 the building was abandoned and the library was relocated and renamed the Beaver Dam Community Library. While the building is no longer used as a library, its Richardsonian Romanesque design remains one of the city's architectural gems.

== History ==
=== Founding ===
The library was founded in 1884 as the Beaver Dam Free City Library and was housed in a room in City Hall. In April 1890, John J. Williams, a wealthy local businessman, offered the library's board of directors $25,000 to construct a new building if, in exchange, the city would pay for the land. The Common Council agreed on April 15, 1890, to purchase a lot belonging to W.H. and T.D. Lawrence at Park Avenue and Spring Street, as well as an adjacent lot owned by Joseph Wagner on Park, for $12,200.

=== Construction ===
Plans were completed by Walter Holbrook of Edward Townsend Mix & Co. of Milwaukee, Wisconsin in May 1890. The library's design was inspired by Henry Hobson Richardson. Construction began in July, with lot preparations completed by August. On August 26, Mayor E. Elwell declared a half-holiday for the cornerstone laying ceremony, which was executed by the local Masons. Collection of the required sandstone and limestone slowed construction, but work was completed in July 1891, with the building's dedication held on July 15, 1891. Thousands were in attendance, as it was held in conjunction with Beaver Dam's semi-centennial celebration.

The doors of the library opened on September 1, 1891, with Mary J. Doolittle as its inaugural librarian. Its initial holdings were made up of 4,500 volumes. Mary's sister Hattie took over the library after Mary's unexpected death in 1897. Hattie served as librarian for the next 47 years.

=== Expansion ===
The library was placed in the National Register of Historic Places in 1974. By 1979 the library had a collection of 52,608 books. As the collection and city grew, the library outgrew the Williams building. The city built a new library incorporating the Williams Free Library, and opened the new Beaver Dam Community Library on North Spring Street on March 4, 1985.

== Dodge County Historical Society and Museum ==
The building has been occupied by the Dodge County Historical Society since 1985. The historic structure that formerly housed the library holdings is now rented for $1 per year to the Dodge County Historical Society and houses its museum.

== Gallery ==
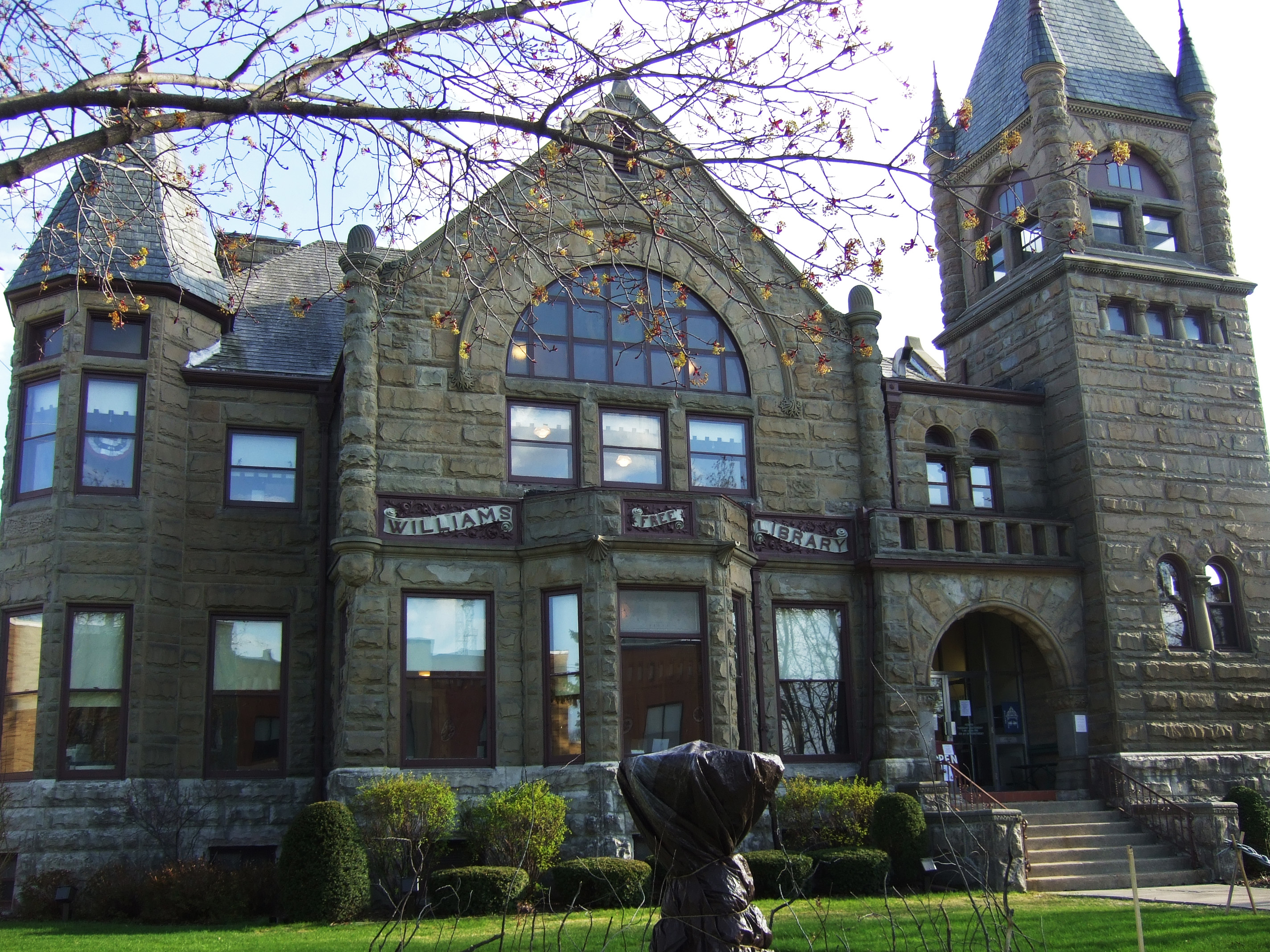
Front view

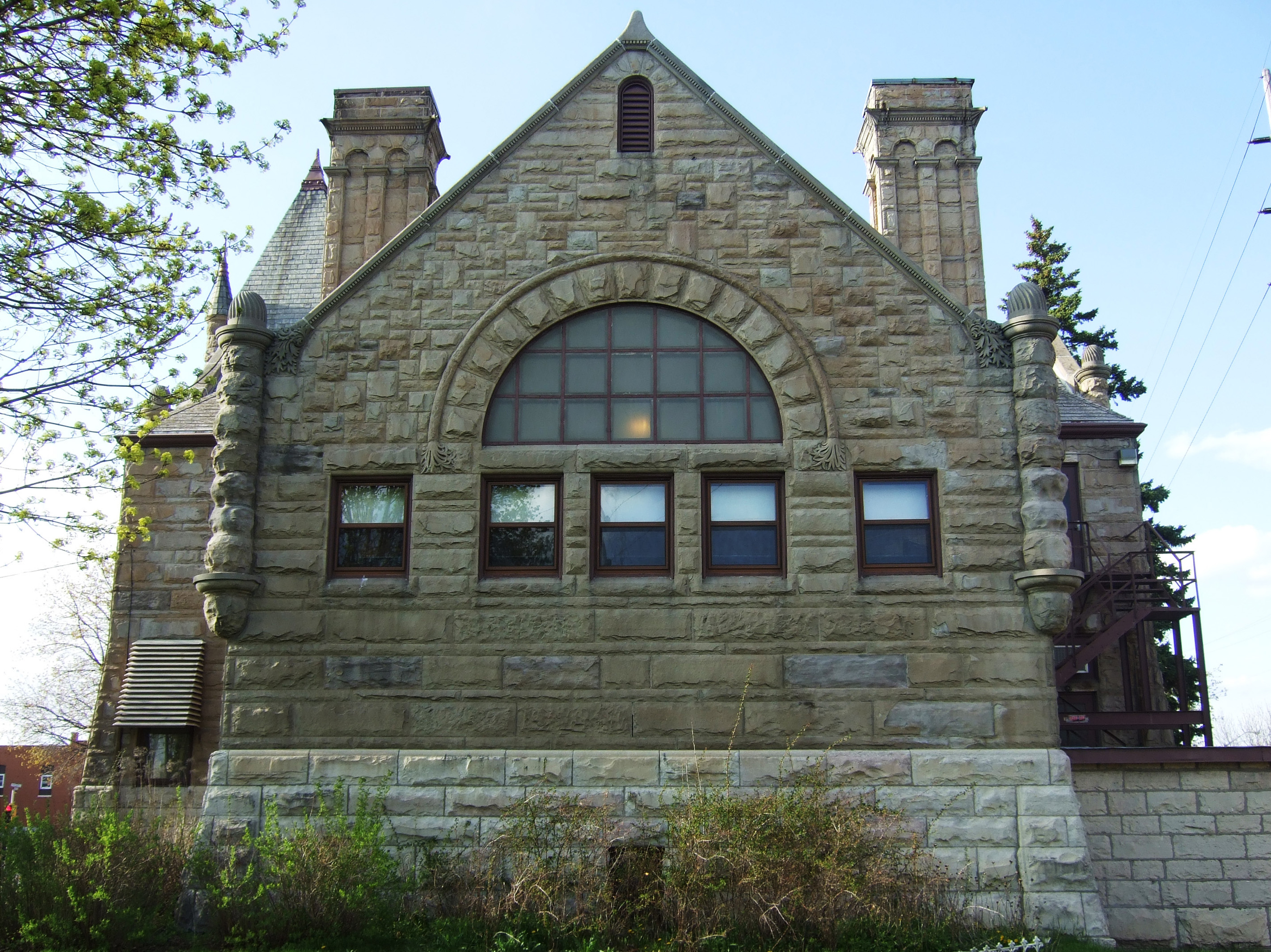
Rear view

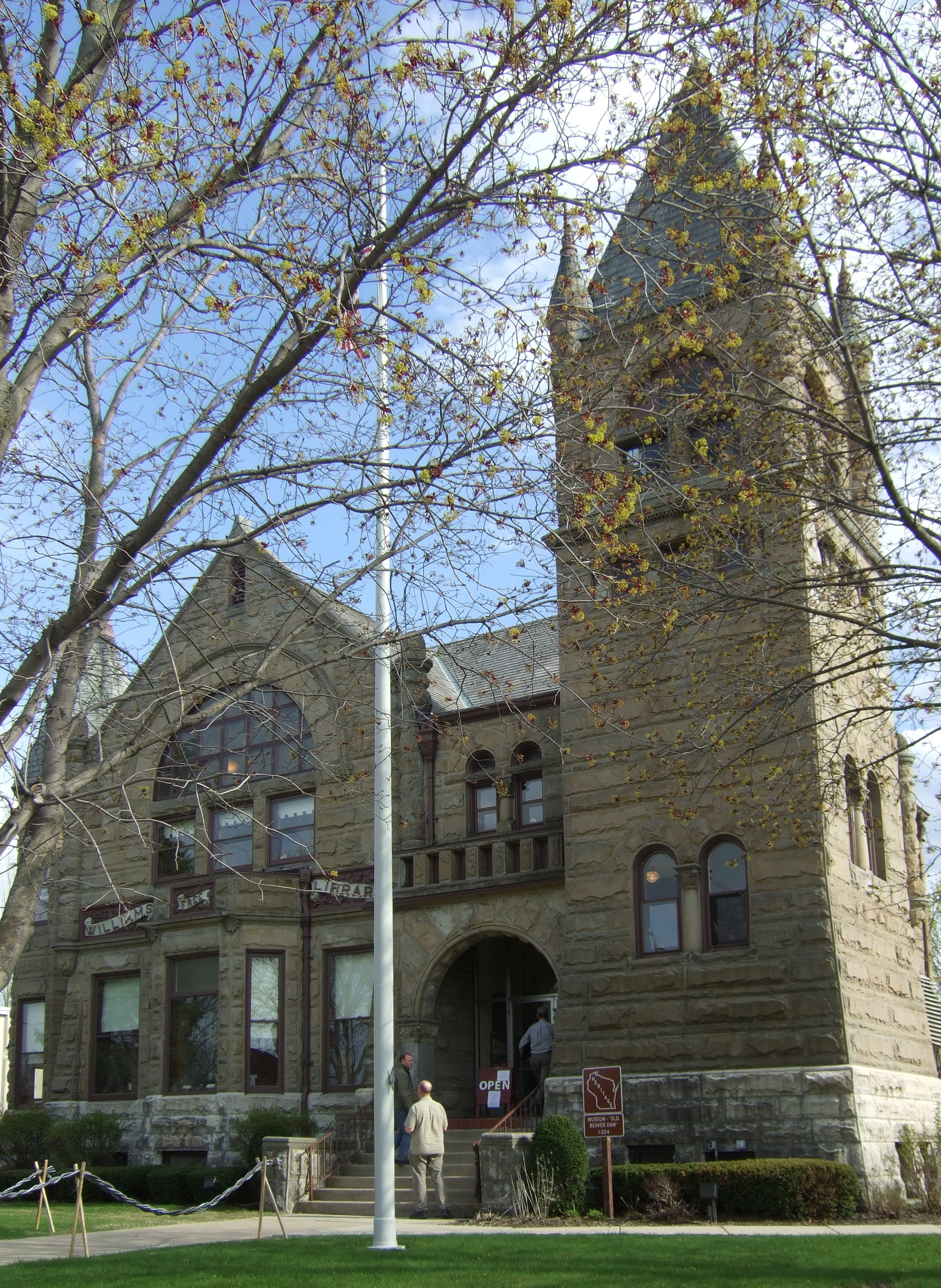
Tower

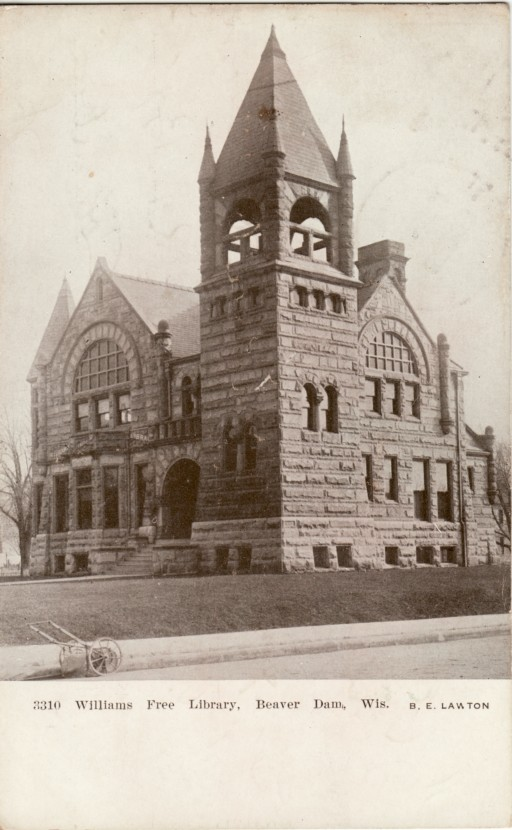
Vintage postcard
