= Philip J. Zink =

American politician and military officer

Philip J. Zink (October 23, 1870 – February 2, 1944) was an American politician and military officer.

Born in Beaver Dam, Wisconsin, Zink served in the Wisconsin National Guard. He served in the Spanish–American War, the Mexican Border Campaign, and World War I, attaining the rank of lieutenant colonel. Zink was a woolen weaver. He served on the local school board and on the Beaver Dam Police and Fire Commission. In 1927, Zink served in the Wisconsin State Assembly as a Democrat. Zink died at the Wood, Wisconsin veterans hospital in Milwaukee.
