= Michael A. Jacobs =

American politician

Michael Anselm Jacobs (March 26, 1860 – February 2, 1936) was an American businessman and politician.

Jacobs was born in Lomira, Dodge County, Wisconsin. He moved with his parents to the town of Beaver Dam. He went to the public and parochial schools in Lomira and Beaver Dam. Jacobs went to Mount Calvary College for a semester. Jacobs was involved with retail and coal business. He then helped organized the German National Bank of Beaver Dam. Jacobs served as clerk of the town of Beaver Dam from 1884 to 1886. He then served as county clerk for Dodge County in 1888 and 1890. He served briefly as chief clerk for the United States General Land Office, Washington, D.C. in 1893. Jacobs also officiated at the opening of the Cherokee Outlet. Jacobs was involved with the Democratic Party and also served on the Dodge County Board of Supervisors for the city of Beaver Dam. Jacobs served in the Wisconsin Senate from 1899 to 1903. He also served as the mayor of Beaver Dam. Jacobs died in a hospital in Tucson, Arizona after being overcome with fumes from a gas heater in his tourist cabin.
