= Mark Born =

21st century American politician (born 1976)

Assembly Co-Chair of the Wisconsin Legislature's Joint Finance Committee
- Incumbent
- Assumed office January 4, 2021
- Preceded by: John Nygren

Member of the Wisconsin State Assembly
- Incumbent
- Assumed office January 6, 2025
- Preceded by: William Penterman
- Constituency: 37th district
- In office January 7, 2013 – January 6, 2025
- Preceded by: Jeff Fitzgerald
- Succeeded by: Alex Dallman
- Constituency: 39th district

Personal details
- Born: April 14, 1976 (age 50) Beaver Dam, Wisconsin U.S.
- Party: Republican
- Spouse: Liberty Ann Bell
- Children: 1
- Education: Gustavus Adolphus College (BA)
- Occupation: Corrections officer, politician
- Website: Official website; Campaign website

Mark Louis Born (born April 14, 1976) is an American Republican politician and former law enforcement officer from Beaver Dam, Wisconsin. He is a member of the Wisconsin State Assembly, representing Wisconsin's 37th Assembly district since 2025; he previously represented the 39th Assembly district from 2013 to 2025. He is the Assembly co-chair of the Wisconsin Legislature's powerful budget-writing Joint Finance Committee, since 2021. Earlier in his career, he also served four years on the Beaver Dam city council (2005–2009), and was chairman of the Republican Party of Dodge County, Wisconsin (2002–2008).

== Early life and career ==
Mark Born was born, raised, and has lived most of his life in Beaver Dam, Wisconsin. As a child, he became active with the church community and youth ministry. He graduated from Beaver Dam High School in 1994, and went on to attend Gustavus Adolphus College, in St. Peter, Minnesota, where he earned his bachelor's degree in political science and history in 1998.

After college, Born returned to Beaver Dam and was employed with the Dodge County sheriff's department; he also served as a police auxiliary until 2004. He took professional development courses at the Wisconsin State Patrol Academy, and was promoted to serve in corrections division administration in 2000.

== Political career ==
Born became active in politics with the Republican Party of Wisconsin when he was only a teenager, volunteering for the campaign of state representative Robert Goetsch in 1992. By 2002 he was county chairman of the Republican Party of Dodge County, Wisconsin. That year, he also served as a campaign coordinator for the gubernatorial campaign of Scott McCallum.

McCallum lost the election, but the following spring, Born announced he would run for Beaver Dam city council. At the April general election, Born was defeated by just 1 vote, receiving 140 votes to Bonnie Arndt's 141. Shortly after the election, however, he was appointed to the city police and fire commission. Two years later, Arndt announced she would not run for re-election to the council; Born ran again and this time won the election. He was re-elected in 2007. For much of his time on the city council, he was chairman of the city council's finance committee.

In December 2007, Born announced he would run for mayor of Beaver Dam in 2008, after the incumbent mayor, Jack Hanke, declined to run. He was opposed in the election by city engineering coordinator Tom Kennedy. Kennedy prevailed in a close election, receiving 52% of the vote. Later that year, Born announced he would not run for re-election to the city council.

After leaving office, Born was active in the 2010 gubernatorial election supporting Scott Walker. After Walker's victory, Born announced that he would run for Wisconsin State Assembly in 2012, in the 39th Assembly district seat being vacated by Jeff Fitzgerald. Born faced two opponents for the Republican primary in the heavily Republican district, former Mayville mayor Tracy Heron and veteran Don Lechner. The candidates were largely aligned on the issues, advocating for less regulation, less spending, and less taxation, but Born had significant institutional support and rose to the top; he won the primary with 50% of the vote. He went on to win the general election, receiving 60% of the vote over Democrat Jim Grigg. Born was easily re-elected five times in the safe Republican district.

In his early years in the Assembly, Born was chairman of the Assembly Committee on Public Benefit Reform, but in the 2017 term he earned a coveted seat on the Legislature's powerful budget-writing Joint Finance Committee and the influential Rules Committee. After the 2020 election, he was named Assembly co-chair of the Joint Finance Committee.

In 2024, the Legislature adopted a new redistricting act, which significantly affected districts lines in Dodge County. Beaver Dam shifted from the 39th district into the 37th district. Under the new map, Born faced a primary challenge from perennial candidate Steve Rydzewski, but won the primary and went on to win his 7th term in the Assembly.

== Personal life and family ==
Born is a son of Allen and Sheri Born; his family has resided in the Beaver Dam area for four generations.

Mark Born married Liberty Ann Bell. They still reside in Beaver Dam and have one child.

== Electoral history ==
=== Beaver Dam city council (2003, 2005, 2007) ===
Year	Election	Date	Elected				Defeated				Total	Plurality
2003	General	Apr. 1	Bonnie Arndt	Nonpartisan	141	47.32%	Mark Born	Non.	140	46.98%	298	1
2003	General	Apr. 1	Bonnie Arndt	Nonpartisan	141	47.32%	Dominic Conforti	Non.	17	5.70%	298	1
2005	General	Apr. 5	Mark Born	Nonpartisan	190	75.40%	Dominic Conforti	Non.	62	24.60%	252	128
2007	General	Apr. 3	Mark Born (inc)	Nonpartisan	262	77.74%	Mark Dehn	Non.	75	22.26%	337	187

=== Beaver Dam mayor (2008) ===
Year	Election	Date	Elected				Defeated				Total	Plurality
2008	General	Apr. 1	Tom Kennedy	Nonpartisan	1,789	52.07%	Mark Born	Non.	1,647	47.93%	3,436	142

=== Wisconsin Assembly, 39th district (2012–2022) ===
Year	Election	Date	Elected				Defeated				Total	Plurality
2012	Primary	Aug. 14	Mark L. Born	Republican	4,023	50.53%	Don Lechner	Rep.	2,381	29.90%	7,962	1,642
2012	Primary	Aug. 14	Mark L. Born	Republican	4,023	50.53%	Tracy A. Heron	Rep.	1,554	19.52%	7,962	1,642
2012	General	Nov. 6	Mark L. Born	Republican	17,465	60.36%	Jim Grigg	Dem.	11,446	39.56%	28,933	6,019
2014	General	Nov. 4	Mark L. Born (inc)	Republican	16,793	73.74%	Richard Bennett	Dem.	5,977	26.25%	22,772	10,816
2016	General	Nov. 8	Mark L. Born (inc)	Republican	19,028	67.42%	Jim Zahn	Dem.	9,192	32.57%	28,222	9,836
2018	General	Nov. 6	Mark L. Born (inc)	Republican	15,940	63.38%	Elisha Barudin	Dem.	9,210	36.62%	25,150	6,730
2020	General	Nov. 3	Mark L. Born (inc)	Republican	22,085	68.73%	Izzy Hassey Nevarez	Dem.	10,049	31.27%	32,134	12,036
2022	General	Nov. 8	Mark L. Born (inc)	Republican	20,284	97.64%	Steve Rydzewski (write-in)	Rep.	412	1.98%	20,775	

=== Wisconsin Assembly, 37th district (2024–present) ===
Year	Election	Date	Elected				Defeated				Total	Plurality
2024	Primary	Aug. 13	Mark L. Born	Republican	4,701	69.45%	Steve Rydzewski	Rep.	2,068	30.55%	6,769	2,633
2024	General	Nov. 5	Mark L. Born	Republican	20,977	68.57%	LaToya Bates	Dem.	9,608	31.41%	30,589	11,369

Wisconsin State Assembly
Preceded by Jeff Fitzgerald	Member of the Wisconsin State Assembly from the 39th district January 7, 2013 – January 6, 2025	Succeeded by Alex Dallman
Preceded by William Penterman	Member of the Wisconsin State Assembly from the 37th district January 6, 2025 – present	Incumbent
Preceded by John Nygren	Assembly Co-Chair of the Wisconsin Legislature's Joint Finance Committee; January 4, 2021 – present	Incumbent
