= Beaver Dam High School (Wisconsin) =

Location
- 500 Gould Street; Beaver Dam, WI 53916; 43.46169°N 88.82007°W

Information
- District: Beaver Dam Unified School District
- Principal: Russ Tronsen
- Teaching staff: 67.75 (FTE)
- Grades: 9th-12th
- Enrollment: 1,052 (2023–2024)
- Student to teacher ratio: 15.53
- Color
- Athletics: see list
- Mascot: The Golden Beaver
- Athletic Conference: Badger Conference
- Website: beaverdam.k12.wi.us/schools/high
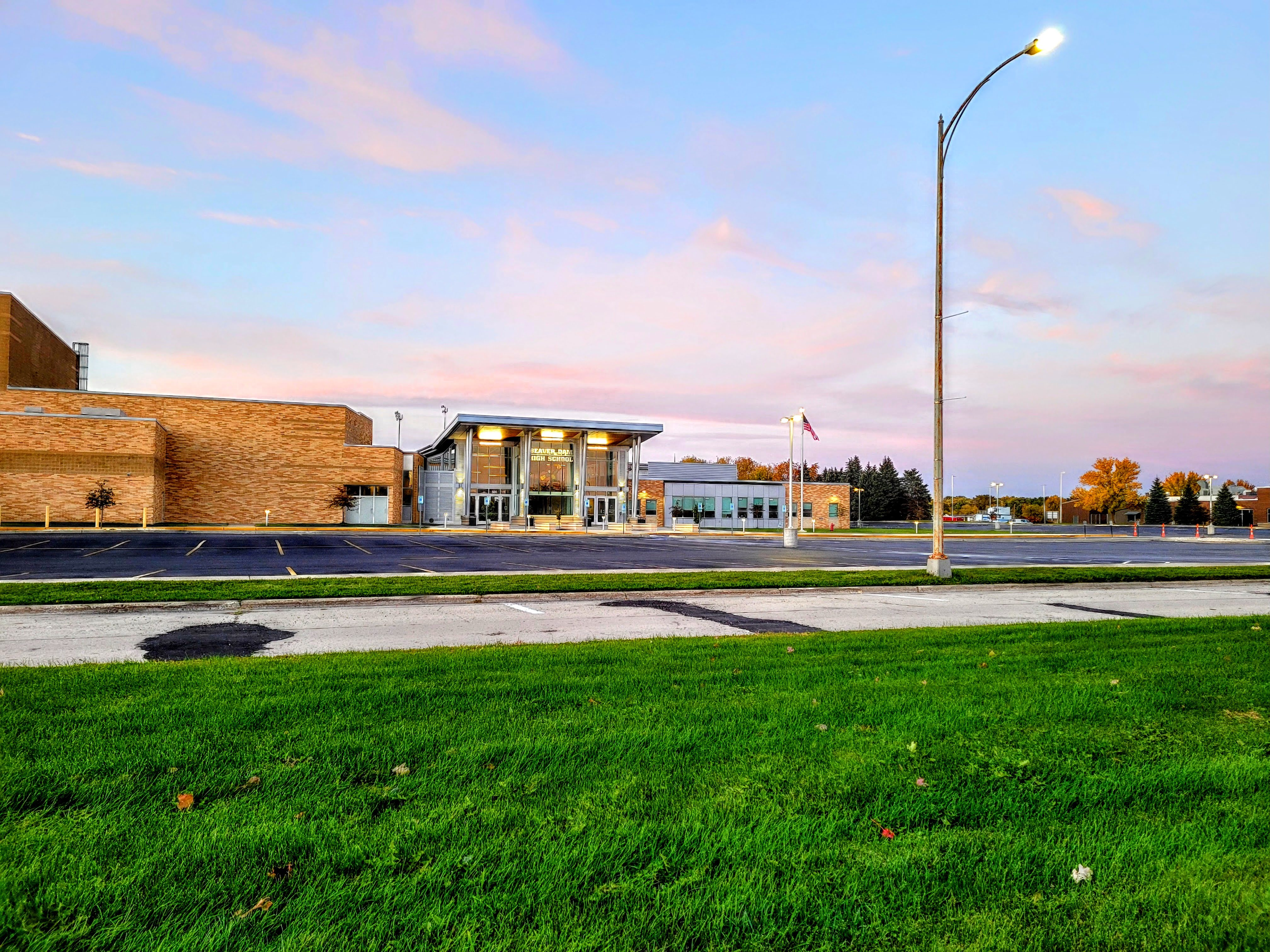
- Main Entrance Beaver Dam High School

Beaver Dam High School is a public high school located in Beaver Dam, Wisconsin, United States. It is a part of the Beaver Dam Unified School District. As of 25 October 2017 it had an enrollment of 1,045 students. Its mascot is the Golden Beaver.

== Extracurricular activities ==
=== Athletics ===
==== Fall ====
- Cross country (M, W)
- Football (M)
- Soccer (M)
- Tennis (W)
- Volleyball (W)
- Swimming (W)
- Golf (W)

==== Winter ====
- Basketball (M, W)
- Varsity cheerleading (M, F)
- Ice hockey (M, W)
- Swimming (M)
- Wrestling (M, W)
- Powerlifting

==== Spring ====
- Baseball (M)
- Golf (M, W)
- Soccer (W)
- Softball (W)
- Tennis (M)
- Track (M, W)

=== Athletic conference affiliation history ===
- Little Ten Conference (1925-1966)
- Southern Little Ten Conference (1966-1970)
- Wisconsin Little Ten Conference (1970-2017)
- Badger Conference (2017–present)

== Gallery ==
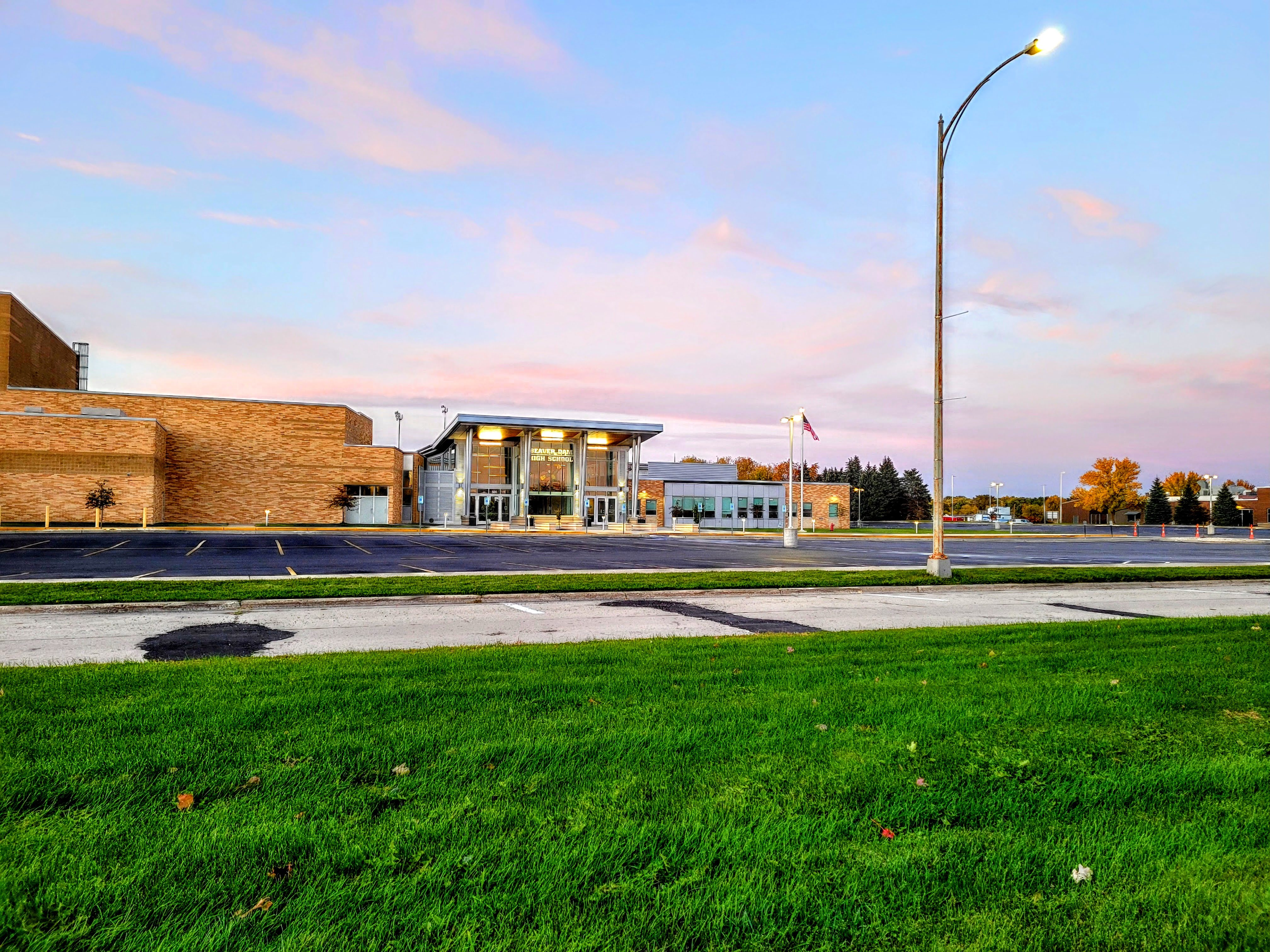
Beaver Dam High School front entrance

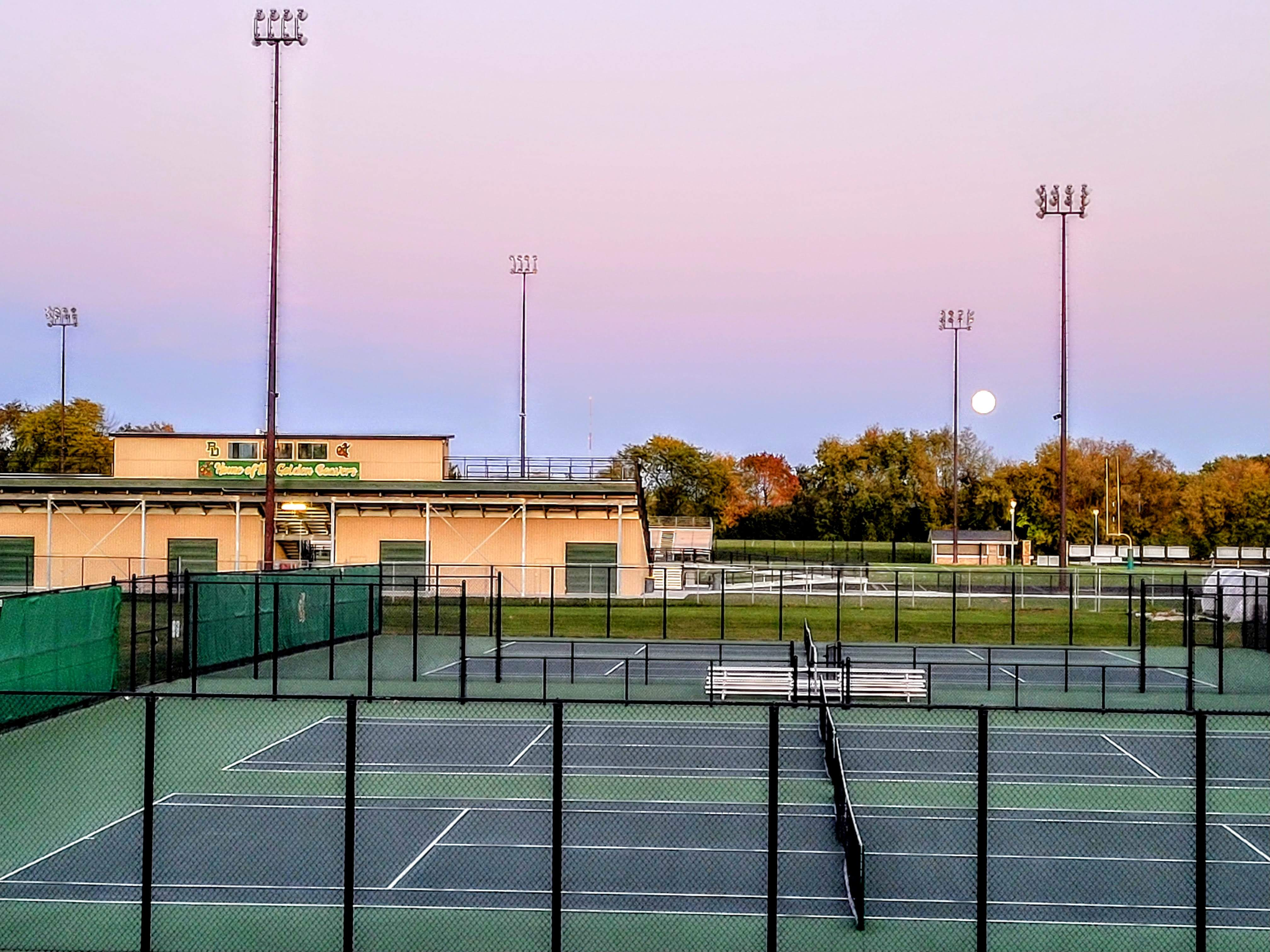
Beaver Dam High School tennis courts

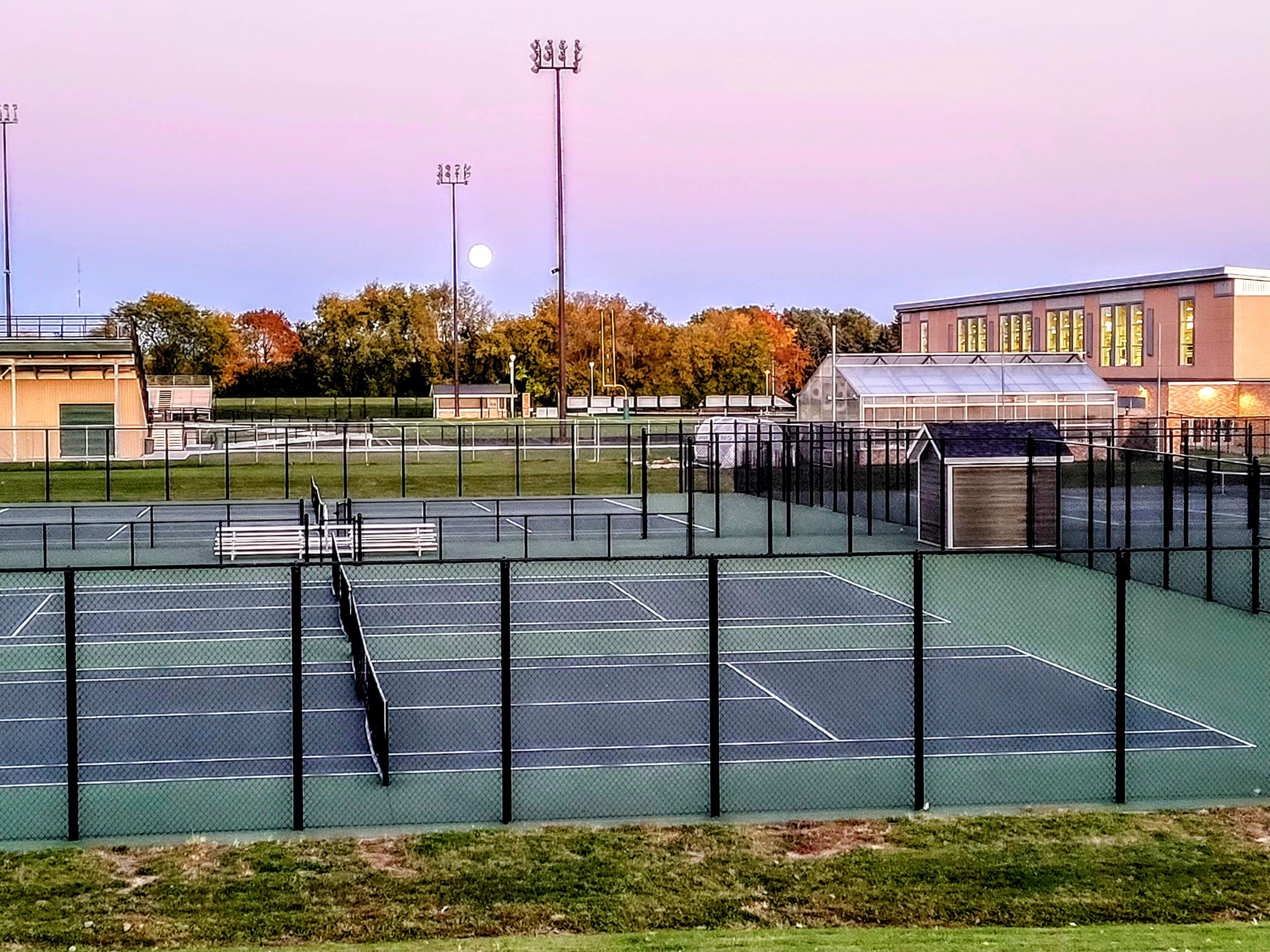
Beaver Dam High School sports facilities

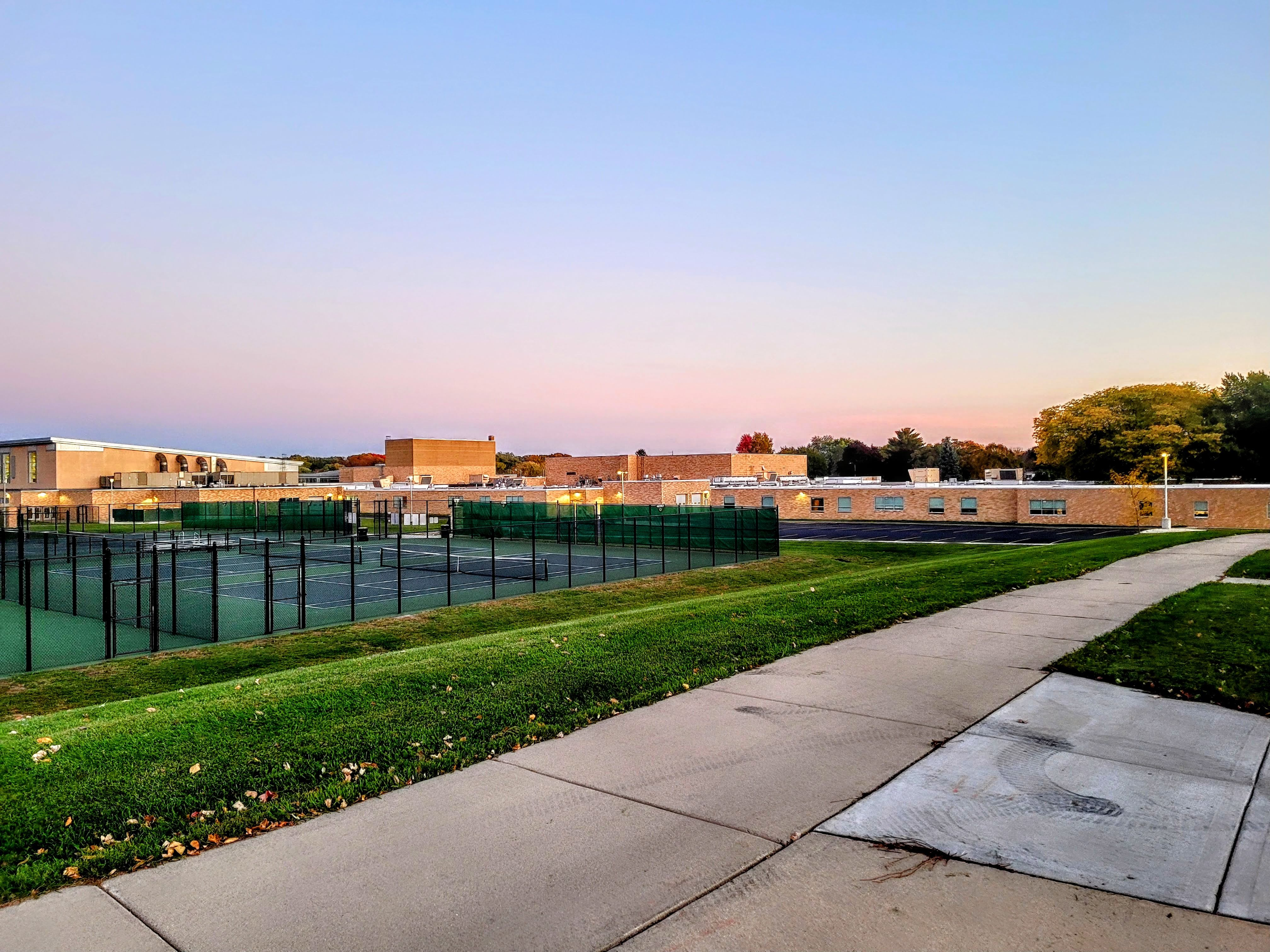
Beaver Dam High School track

== Notable alumni ==
=== Science, media and the arts ===
- Lois J. Ehlert – artist, award-winning author, *Caldecott Medal recipient, and illustrator of children's books
- Raymond Z. Gallun – pioneer science fiction author
- Fred MacMurray – actor
- David Alan Smith – actor

=== Government ===
- Mark Born – Wisconsin state representative
- Leon Epstein – Professor of Political Science, University of Wisconsin—Madison
- Robert Kastenmeier – Wisconsin Representative to U.S. Congress

=== Sports ===
- Eric Baldwin – professional poker player and 2009 Cardplayer of the year
- Randall Herbst – collegiate basketball coach
- Doug Lloyd – professional football player
- Bill Rentmeester – professional football player
- Richard Linde - Award Winning Athlete
