= Beaver Dam Unified School District =

School district in Wisconsin, United States

Location
- 705 McKinley Street; Beaver Dam, Wisconsin 53916 Dodge County, WI United States

District information
- Grades: PK-12
- Superintendent: Mark DiStefano
- Schools: 9

Students and staff
- Students: 3,390 (as of 2007-08)
- Teachers: 234.5 (FTE) (as of 2007-08)
- Staff: 166.8 (FTE) (as of 2007-08)
- Student–teacher ratio: 14.5 (as of 2007-08)
- Athletic conference: Badger North
- District mascot: Golden Beavers

Other information
- Website: beaverdam.k12.wi.us

Beaver Dam Unified School District is a public school district in the city of Beaver Dam, Wisconsin.

== School ==
The District includes the following schools:

- Jefferson Elementary
- Lincoln Elementary
- Prairie View Elementary
- Washington Elementary
- Beaver Dam Middle School
- Beaver Dam High School
