= Gil Sterr =

American football player (1900–1974)

Profile
- Position: Blocking back

Personal information
- Born: July 3, 1900; Beaver Dam, Wisconsin
- Died: March 12, 1974 (aged 73); Beaver Dam, Wisconsin
- Listed height: 5 ft 6 in (1.68 m)
- Listed weight: 160 lb (73 kg)

Career information
- College: Carroll (WI)

Career history
- Racine Tornadoes (1926)
- Stats at Pro Football Reference

Gilbert N. "Gibby" Sterr (July 3, 1900 – March 12, 1974) was a player in the National Football League who played two or three games for the Racine Tornadoes in 1926. He played at the collegiate level at Carroll University from 1921 to 1924.

Sterr was born on July 3, 1900, in Beaver Dam, Wisconsin. He graduated from Beaver Dam High School. He later operated a floral shop and a tavern in Beaver Dam and also worked in a foundry. He died in Beaver Dam in 1974.
