= Fox River National Wildlife Refuge =

Wildlife refuge in Wisconsin, USA

- IUCN category IV (habitat/species management area)
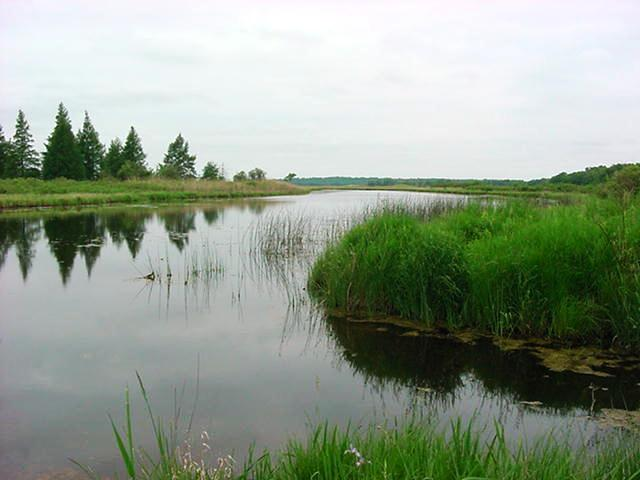
- Fox River National Wildlife Refuge, April 2012

- Location within the United States
- Location: Buffalo, Marquette County, Wisconsin, United States
- Nearest city: Endeavor, Wisconsin
- Coordinates: 43.6882°N 89.4092°W
- Area: 1,054 acres (4.27 km^{2})
- Established: 1979
- Governing body: U.S. Fish and Wildlife Service
- Website: https://www.fws.gov/refuge/fox_river/ Fox River National Wildlife Refuge]

Fox River National Wildlife Refuge, managed by staff at Horicon National Wildlife Refuge, encompasses 1,054 acres (4.27 km^{2}) of wetland and upland habitat along the Fox River in the Town of Buffalo, in Marquette County, Wisconsin, United States.

Refuge staff restores, enhances, and preserves the oak savanna upland and sedge meadow wetland habitats historically found in extensive areas along the Fox River. Staff manage the wildlife populations that use these habitats, with special emphasis on those species dependent upon large expanses of natural marsh, such as the greater sandhill crane.

Other management objectives include protecting the habitats of any federal or state endangered or threatened species within the refuge, such as the state threatened Blanding's turtle, and to make the refuge available for outdoor recreation, environmental education, and other public-use activities compatible with the above objectives.
