= Beaver Dam, Wisconsin =

City in Wisconsin, United States

- City
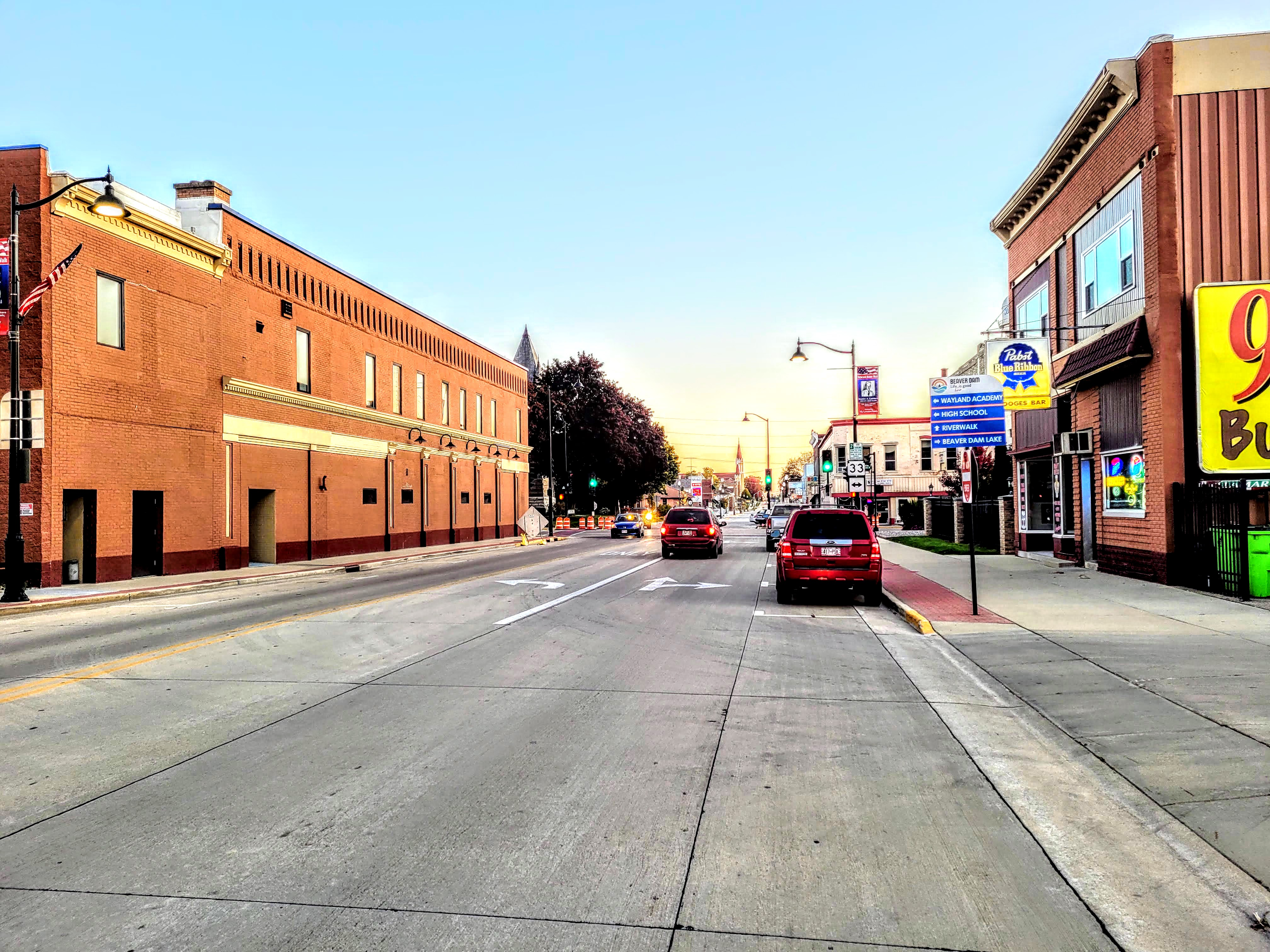
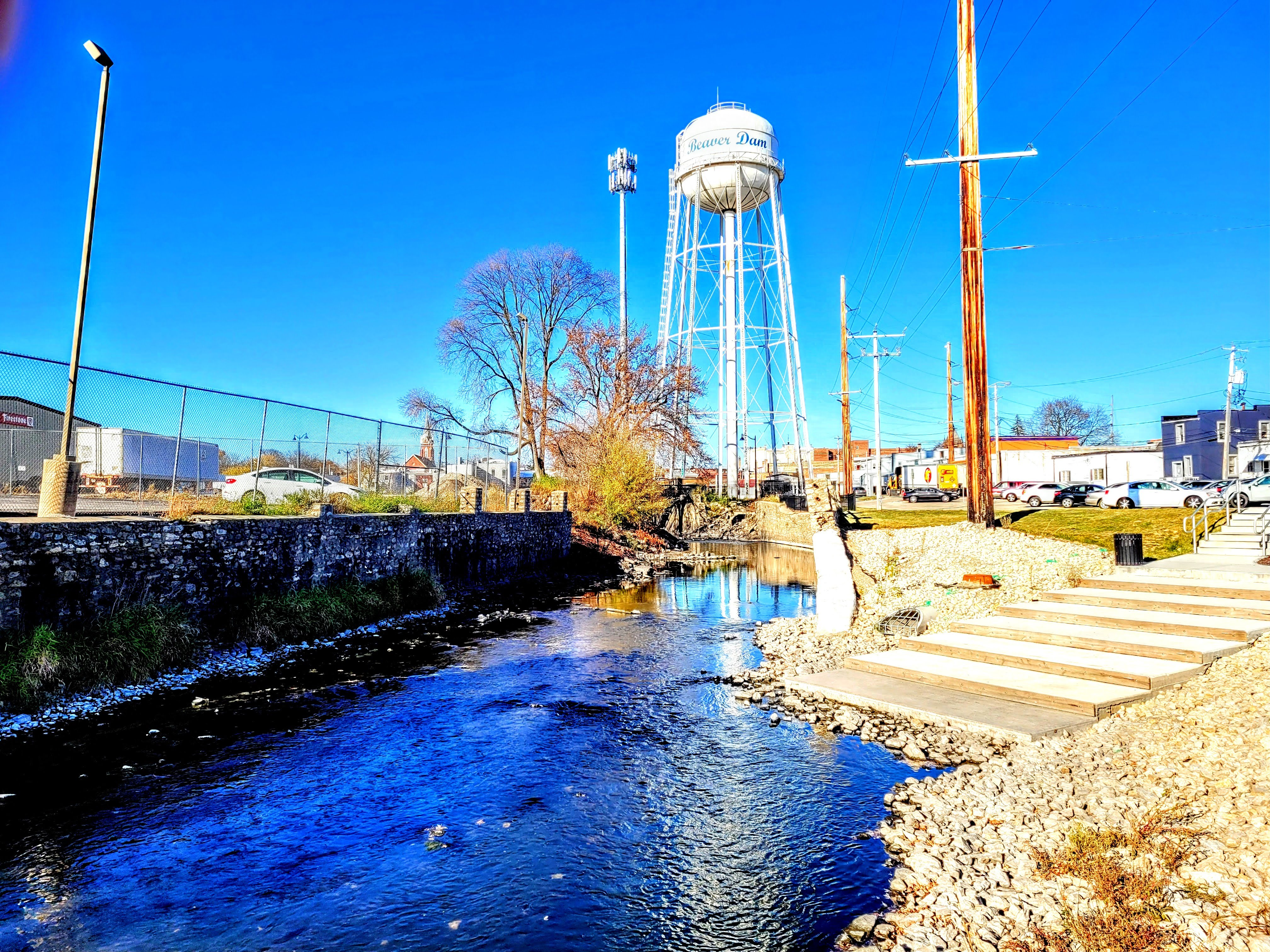
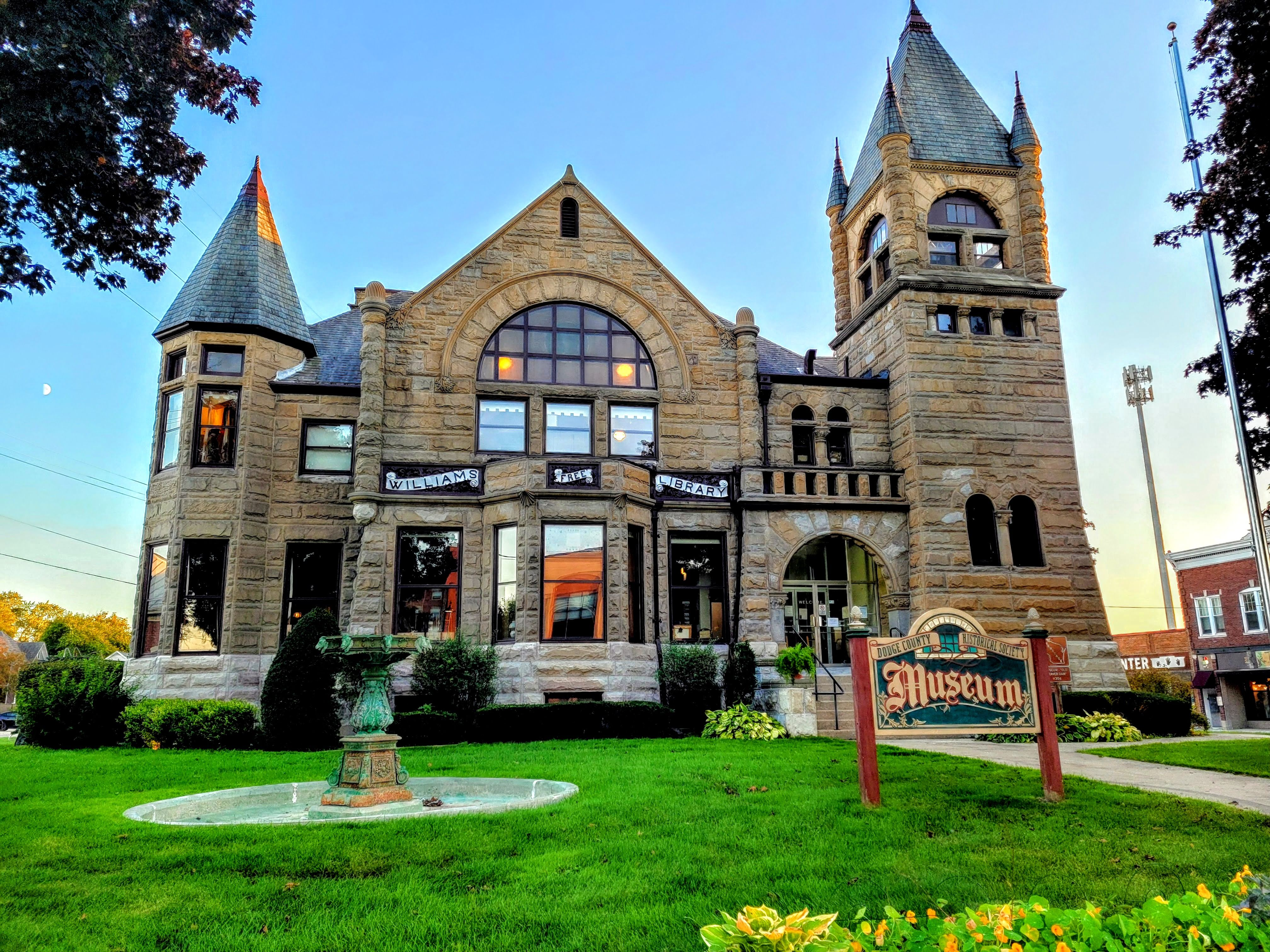
- Downtown Beaver Dam Beaver Dam River Historical Society

- Location of Beaver Dam in Dodge County, Wisconsin

- Location of Beaver Dam in Wisconsin Beaver Dam (the United States)
- Coordinates: 43°27′35″N 88°50′9″W
- Country: United States
- State: Wisconsin
- County: Dodge
- Settled: 1852

Government
  - Mayor: Roberta Marck

Area
  - City: 8.70 sq mi (22.52 km^{2})
  - Land: 7.31 sq mi (18.94 km^{2})
  - Water: 1.39 sq mi (3.59 km^{2}) 16.89%
- Elevation: 879 ft (268 m)

Population (2020)
  - City: 16,708
  - Density: 2,243.1/sq mi (866.07/km^{2})
  - Metro: 88,489
- Time zone: Central
- ZIP code: 53916
- Area code: 920
- FIPS code: 55-05900
- GNIS feature ID: 1561457
- Website: www.cityofbeaverdam.com

Beaver Dam is a city in Dodge County, Wisconsin, United States, along Beaver Dam Lake and the Beaver Dam River. The population was 16,708 at the 2020 census, making it the largest city primarily located in Dodge County. It is the principal city of the Beaver Dam Micropolitan Statistical area which is included in the larger Milwaukee–Waukesha–Racine CSA. The city is adjacent to the Town of Beaver Dam.

== History ==
Beaver Dam was first settled by Thomas Mackie and Joseph Goetschius in 1841; by 1843, it had a population of almost 100. The city was named for an old beaver dam located in a stream flowing into Beaver Dam River. The area had also been known as Okwaanim, Chippewa for beaver dam. The community was incorporated as a city on March 18, 1856. That same year the Milwaukee Railroad reached the area, encouraging further growth.

Beaver Dam hosted a World War II prisoner of war camp called Camp Beaver Dam in the summer of 1944. The camp held 300 German prisoners in a tent city encampment where the Wayland Academy field house now stands.

== Geography and climate ==
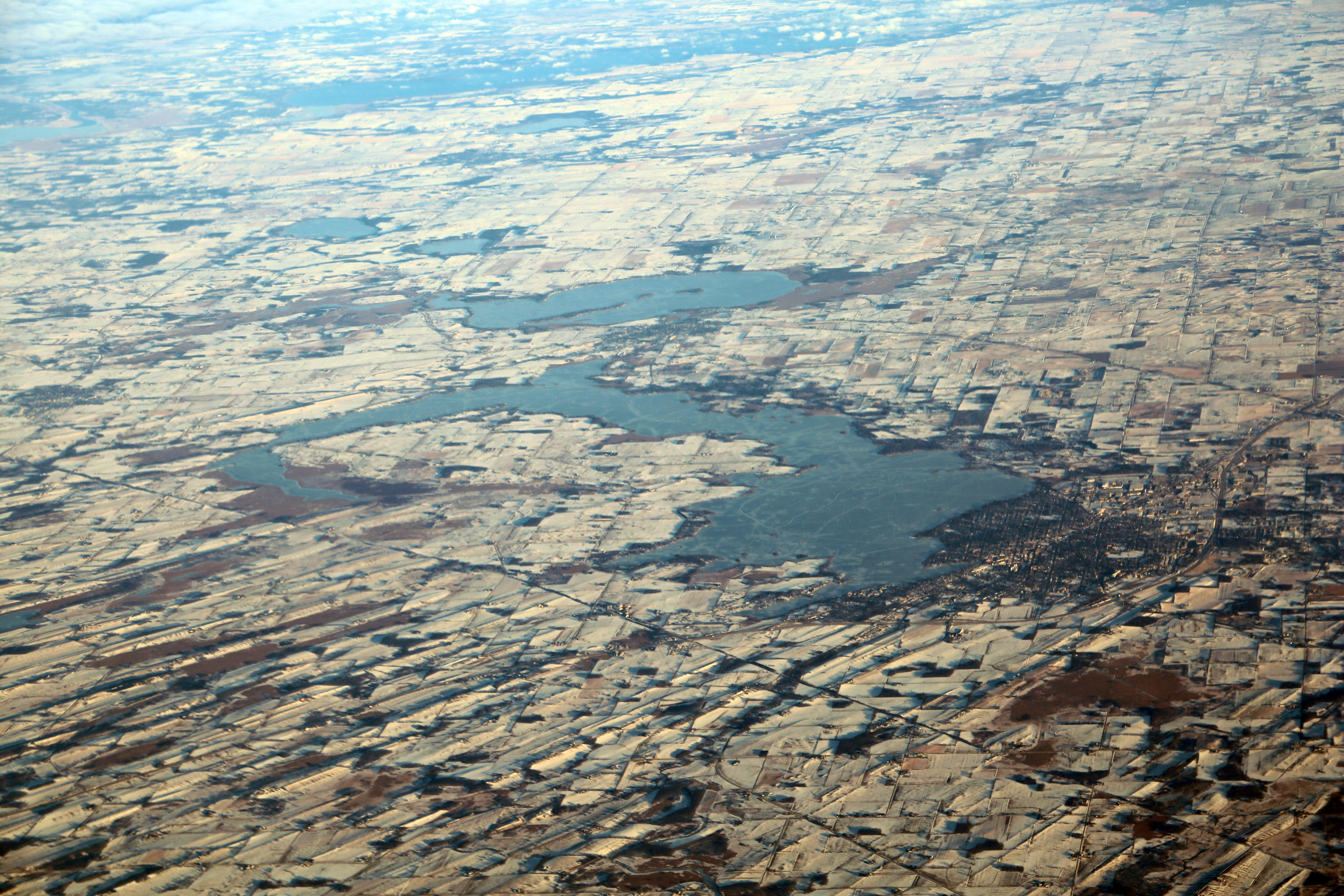
Drumlins near Beaver Dam in one of the largest drumlin fields in the world

Beaver Dam is located at 43°27′35″N 88°50′9″W (43.459967, −88.836066). According to the United States Census Bureau, the city has a total area of 8.70 square miles (22.53 km^{2}), of which 7.31 square miles (18.93 km^{2}) is land and 1.38 square miles (3.57 km^{2}) is water.

Beaver Dam has a warm-summer humid continental climate (Köppen: Dfb). Since 1996, the average annual snowfall in Beaver Dam has been 63.5 inches (161 cm). The 2007–2008 winter season was the snowiest on record with 119.7 inches (304 cm).

Climate data for Beaver Dam Wastewater Treatment Plant, Wisconsin (1991–2020 normals, extremes 1893–1895, 1953–present)
Month	Jan	Feb	Mar	Apr	May	Jun	Jul	Aug	Sep	Oct	Nov	Dec	Year
Record high °F (°C)	59 (15)	70 (21)	81 (27)	90 (32)	98 (37)	98 (37)	102 (39)	100 (38)	97 (36)	89 (32)	76 (24)	65 (18)	102 (39)
Mean maximum °F (°C)	44.8 (7.1)	49.1 (9.5)	64.2 (17.9)	76.3 (24.6)	84.1 (28.9)	89.2 (31.8)	90.1 (32.3)	89.1 (31.7)	86.6 (30.3)	78.8 (26.0)	63.7 (17.6)	49.4 (9.7)	92.5 (33.6)
Mean daily maximum °F (°C)	24.7 (−4.1)	28.6 (−1.9)	40.8 (4.9)	54.3 (12.4)	66.5 (19.2)	76.6 (24.8)	80.1 (26.7)	78.3 (25.7)	71.6 (22.0)	58.4 (14.7)	42.9 (6.1)	30.4 (−0.9)	54.4 (12.4)
Daily mean °F (°C)	16.8 (−8.4)	20.0 (−6.7)	31.6 (−0.2)	44.1 (6.7)	56.1 (13.4)	66.2 (19.0)	70.0 (21.1)	68.3 (20.2)	60.6 (15.9)	48.1 (8.9)	34.5 (1.4)	22.9 (−5.1)	44.9 (7.2)
Mean daily minimum °F (°C)	8.8 (−12.9)	11.4 (−11.4)	22.5 (−5.3)	33.9 (1.1)	45.7 (7.6)	55.8 (13.2)	59.8 (15.4)	58.2 (14.6)	49.6 (9.8)	37.9 (3.3)	26.2 (−3.2)	15.4 (−9.2)	35.4 (1.9)
Mean minimum °F (°C)	−11.5 (−24.2)	−6.6 (−21.4)	3.7 (−15.7)	22.2 (−5.4)	33.1 (0.6)	44.0 (6.7)	50.8 (10.4)	48.9 (9.4)	36.4 (2.4)	25.5 (−3.6)	12.6 (−10.8)	−3.3 (−19.6)	−15.1 (−26.2)
Record low °F (°C)	−36 (−38)	−30 (−34)	−22 (−30)	6 (−14)	23 (−5)	34 (1)	35 (2)	37 (3)	26 (−3)	14 (−10)	−12 (−24)	−24 (−31)	−36 (−38)
Average precipitation inches (mm)	1.49 (38)	1.42 (36)	2.13 (54)	3.83 (97)	4.05 (103)	5.04 (128)	4.14 (105)	4.07 (103)	3.26 (83)	3.04 (77)	2.15 (55)	1.65 (42)	36.27 (921)
Average snowfall inches (cm)	13.0 (33)	10.6 (27)	6.6 (17)	1.7 (4.3)	0.1 (0.25)	0.0 (0.0)	0.0 (0.0)	0.0 (0.0)	0.0 (0.0)	0.4 (1.0)	2.1 (5.3)	8.8 (22)	43.3 (110)
Average precipitation days (≥ 0.01 in)	9.6	8.7	9.3	10.9	11.9	11.2	10.1	9.5	9.5	10.1	8.4	9.6	118.8
Average snowy days (≥ 0.1 in)	5.3	4.9	2.8	0.8	0.0	0.0	0.0	0.0	0.0	0.2	1.3	5.0	20.3
Source: NOAA

== Demographics ==
Historical population
Census	Pop.	Note	%±
1860	2,765		—
1870	3,265		18.1%
1880	3,416		4.6%
1890	4,222		23.6%
1900	5,128		21.5%
1910	6,758		31.8%
1920	7,992		18.3%
1930	9,867		23.5%
1940	10,356		5.0%
1950	11,867		14.6%
1960	13,118		10.5%
1970	14,265		8.7%
1980	14,149		−0.8%
1990	14,196		0.3%
2000	15,169		6.9%
2010	16,214		6.9%
2020	16,708		3.0%
U.S. Decennial Census

=== 2020 census ===
As of the 2020 census, Beaver Dam had a population of 16,708. The median age was 39.5 years. 22.4% of residents were under the age of 18 and 18.9% of residents were 65 years of age or older. For every 100 females there were 95.7 males, and for every 100 females age 18 and over there were 92.2 males age 18 and over.

The population density was 2,284.7 inhabitants per square mile (882.1/km^{2}). There were 7,699 housing units at an average density of 1,052.8 units per square mile (406.5 units/km^{2}). Of housing units, 6.0% were vacant. The homeowner vacancy rate was 1.6% and the rental vacancy rate was 5.7%.

100.0% of residents lived in urban areas, while 0.0% lived in rural areas.

There were 7,239 households in Beaver Dam, of which 27.7% had children under the age of 18 living in them. Of all households, 38.1% were married-couple households, 21.7% were households with a male householder and no spouse or partner present, and 30.3% were households with a female householder and no spouse or partner present. About 35.8% of all households were made up of individuals and 15.7% had someone living alone who was 65 years of age or older.

Racial composition as of the 2020 census
Race	Number	Percent
White	14,207	85.0%
Black or African American	286	1.7%
American Indian and Alaska Native	50	0.3%
Asian	151	0.9%
Native Hawaiian and Other Pacific Islander	0	0.0%
Some other race	789	4.7%
Two or more races	1,225	7.3%
Hispanic or Latino (of any race)	1,919	11.5%

=== Income, poverty, and education ===
According to the American Community Survey estimates for 2016–2020, the median income for a household in the city was $55,551, and the median income for a family was $73,309. Male full-time workers had a median income of $48,773 versus $40,140 for female workers. The per capita income for the city was $30,729. About 6.2% of families and 8.3% of the population were below the poverty line, including 11.2% of those under age 18 and 7.0% of those age 65 or over. Of the population age 25 and over, 93.0% were high school graduates or higher and 21.4% had a bachelor's degree or higher.

=== 2010 census ===
As of the census of 2010, there were 16,214 people, 6,819 households, and 4,113 families residing in the city. The population density was 2,387.9 inhabitants per square mile (922.0/km^{2}). There were 7,326 housing units at an average density of 1,078.9 units per square mile (416.6 units/km^{2}). The racial makeup of the city was 93.0% White, 0.8% African American, 0.3% Native American, 1.0% Asian, 3.4% from other races, and 1.5% from two or more races. Hispanic or Latino people of any race were 7.5% of the population.

There were 6,819 households, of which 30.6% had children under the age of 18 living with them, 43.1% were married couples living together, 12.1% had a female householder with no husband present, 5.1% had a male householder with no wife present, and 39.7% were non-families. 33.7% of all households were made up of individuals, and 14.6% had someone living alone who was 65 years of age or older. The average household size was 2.32 and the average family size was 2.95.

The median age in the city was 37.7 years. 25.1% of residents were under the age of 18; 7.7% were between the ages of 18 and 24; 26.1% were from 25 to 44; 25% were from 45 to 64; and 16.1% were 65 years of age or older. The gender makeup of the city was 48.4% male and 51.6% female.

=== 2000 census ===
As of the census of 2000, there were 15,169 people, 6,349 households, and 3,999 families residing in the city. The population density was 2,904.6 people per square mile (1,121.5 people/km^{2}). There were 6,685 housing units at an average density of 1,280.1 units per square mile (494.2 units/km^{2}). The racial makeup of the city was 95.95% White, 0.44% Black or African American, 0.32% Native American, 0.61% Asian, 0.05% Pacific Islander, 1.61% from other races, and 1.04% from two or more races. 4.22% of the population were Hispanic or Latino of any race.

There were 6,349 households, out of which 31.3% had children under the age of 18 living with them, 49.0% were married couples living together, 10.4% had a female householder with no husband present, and 37.0% were non-families. 31.3% of all households were made up of individuals, and 13.8% had someone living alone who was 65 years of age or older. The average household size was 2.35 and the average family size was 2.94.

In the city, the population was spread out, with 25.0% under the age of 18, 8.2% from 18 to 24, 29.3% from 25 to 44, 21.1% from 45 to 64, and 16.5% who were 65 years of age or older. The median age was 37 years. For every 100 females, there were 93.2 males. For every 100 females age 18 and over, there were 89.7 males.

== Arts and culture ==
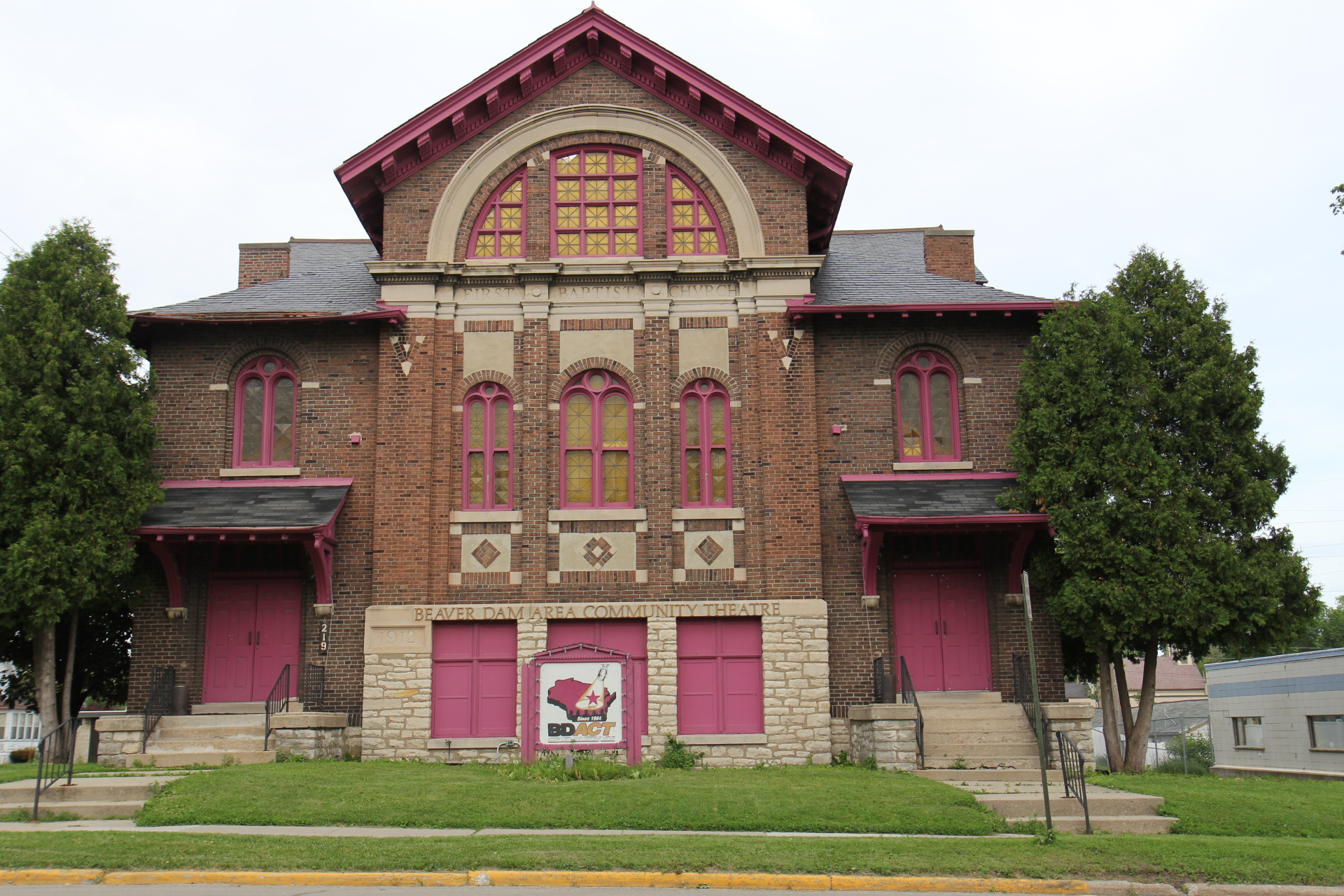
Beaver Dam Area Community Theatre

The following events are held each year in Beaver Dam:

January:

- Cabin Fever Fest – 4th Sunday

March:

- Kiwanis Pancake Breakfast – 1st Sunday

April:

- Rotary Casino Night – 1st Saturday
- Beaver Dam Area Orchestra Annual Spring Concert – 3rd Saturday

May:

- Race Into Summer Festival – Sunday of Memorial Day weekend
- Memorial Day Parade – Memorial Day

June:

- Taste of Wisconsin (beer & cheese tasting) – Saturday before Father's Day
- Swan City Classic Car Show – Father's Day

July:

- Best Dam Fest / Swan Park Craft Fair – 2nd weekend

August:

- Corn Roast – 1st Thursday
- Dodge County Fair – 3rd Wednesday through the following Sunday

October

- Fall Downtown Fest

November:

- Midwest Cream Cheese Competition – Saturday of opening of deer hunting
- Economic Update Luncheon – 3rd Wednesday

December:

- Christmas Parade – 1st Saturday

== Government ==
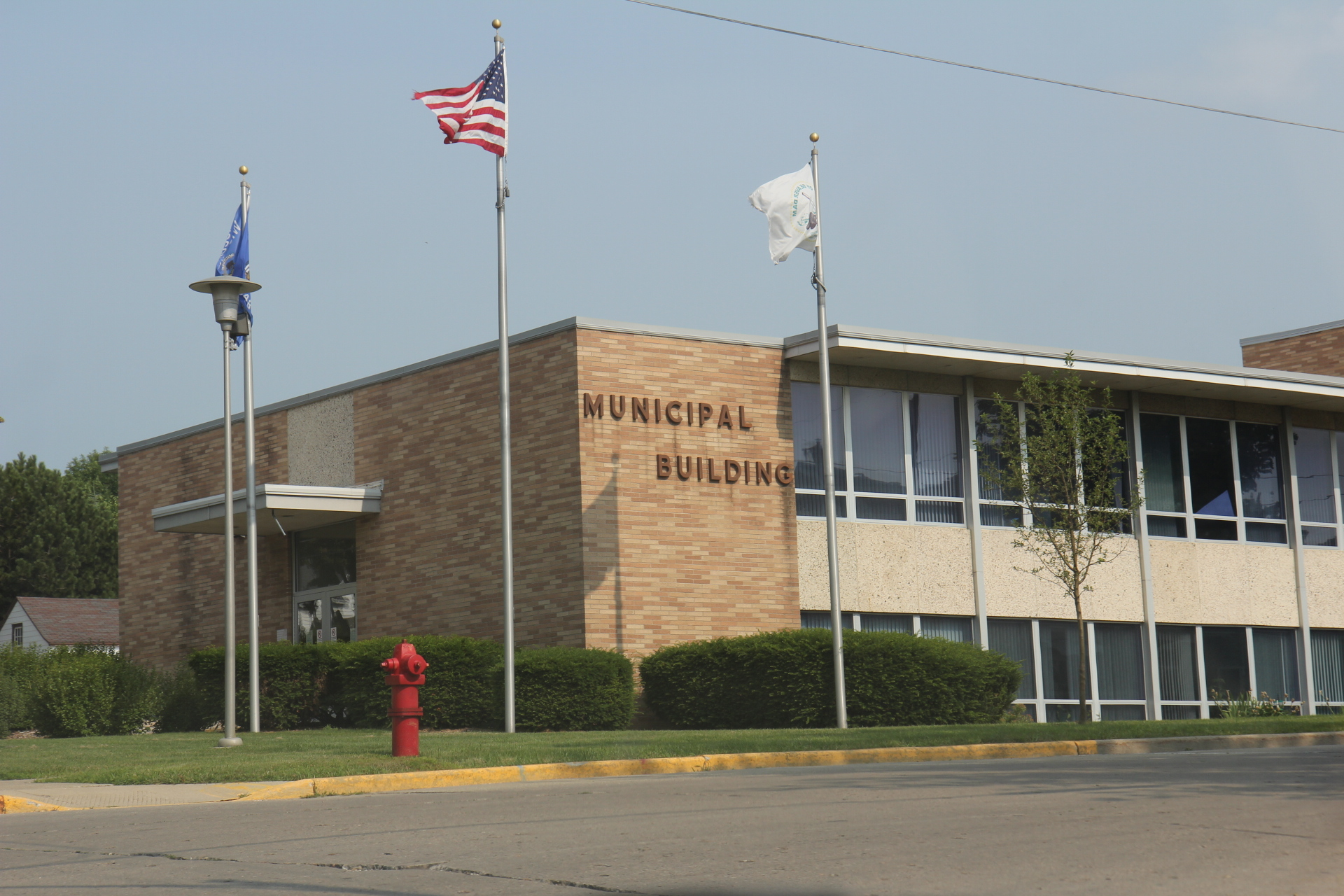
Beaver Dam Municipal Building

Beaver Dam is represented by Glenn Grothman (R) in the United States House of Representatives, and by Ron Johnson (R) and Tammy Baldwin (D) in the United States Senate. John Jagler (R) represents Beaver Dam in the Wisconsin State Senate, and Mark Born (R) in the Wisconsin State Assembly.

== Education ==
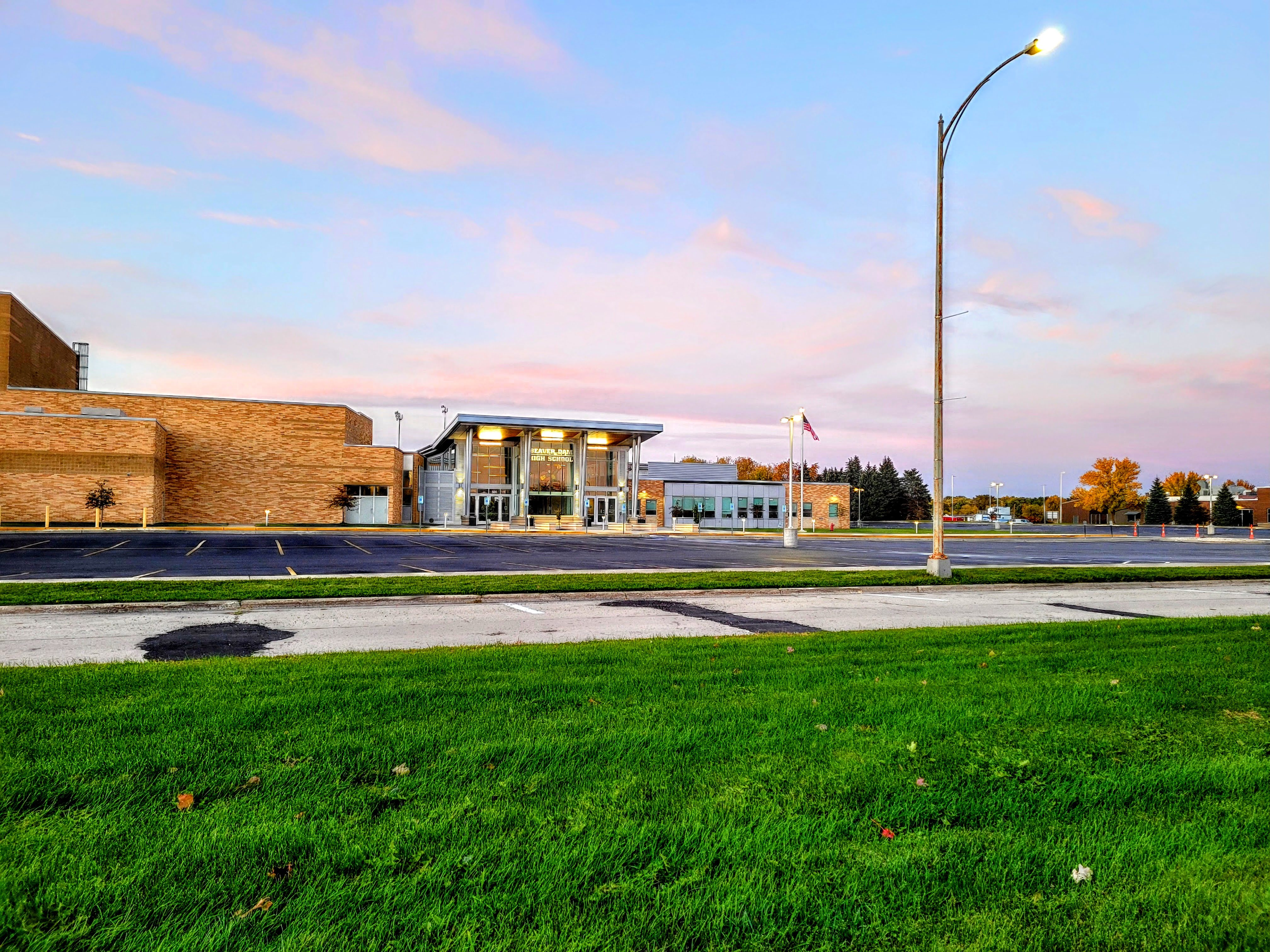
Beaver Dam High School

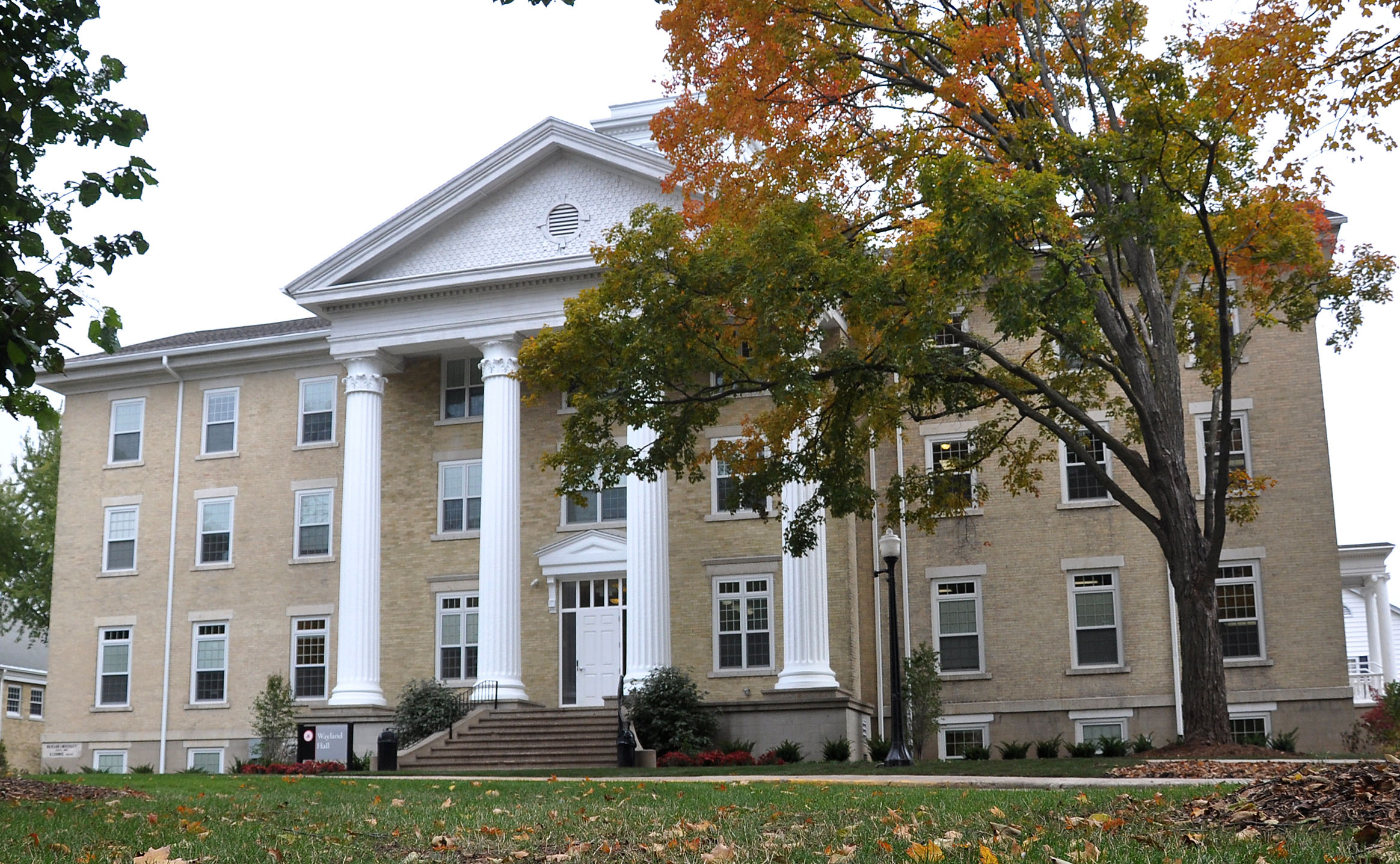
Wayland Hall

The Beaver Dam Unified School District provides public education in the area. Beaver Dam has five public primary schools, one middle school, and Beaver Dam High School. An alternative school, the Don Smith Learning Academy, is part of the Beaver Dam Unified School District.

There are two parochial primary schools: St. Katharine Drexel (grades: Pre-K to 8th), and St. Stephen's Evangelical Lutheran (grades: K to 8th). The city is also home to Wayland Academy, a private school.

The Beaver Dam campus of Moraine Park Technical College is located in the city.

== Healthcare ==
Marshfield Medical Center-Beaver Dam is a 163-bed hospital. There are 44.4 primary care physicians per 100,000 population in Beaver Dam. There are two behavioral health professionals in Beaver Dam.

The area is designated as both a mental health and primary care Health Professional Shortage Area (HPSA), qualifying the region as a medical desert. By 2035, Beaver Dam is expected to have a 48.4% deficit in primary care physicians, the eighth largest predicted deficit in Wisconsin.

== In popular culture ==
=== Films shot in Beaver Dam ===
- Public Enemies (2009), starring Johnny Depp, Marion Cotillard & Christian Bale
- The Pit (1981), starring Sammy Snyders & Jeannie Elias
- Thirteen Hours by Air (1936), starring Fred MacMurray & Joan Bennett

=== Films shot about Beaver Dam ===
- Yoga Matt (2008) (short), starring Saturday Night Live & MADtv actors
- Pardon My Past (1945), starring Fred MacMurray, with many references to Beaver Dam

=== Films referencing Beaver Dam ===
- For Me and My Gal (1942), in which "Beaverdam, Wis." is the first stop for Palmer & Hayden after they team up
- Pardon My Past (1945), in which "Beaverdam, Wis." is the destination of Eddie and Chuck to start a mink farm after leaving the service

== Notable people ==
=== Government ===
- Claire B. Bird, Wisconsin State Senator
- Mark Born, Wisconsin state legislator
- Samuel D. Burchard, U.S. Representative
- Michael E. Burke, U.S. Representative
- Jesse A. Canniff. Wisconsin state legislator, farmer, businessman
- Columbus Germain, Wisconsin legislator
- David C. Gowdey, member of the Wisconsin State Assembly
- Charles M. Hambright, Wisconsin State Representative
- Michael A. Jacobs, Wisconsin State Senator
- Andre Jacque, member of the Wisconsin State Assembly
- Edwin J. Jones, Minnesota state senator
- William Jones, member of the Wisconsin State Assembly
- Robert Kastenmeier, U.S. Representative
- Daniel E. La Bar, Wisconsin State Representative
- Walter J. LaBuy, U.S. District Court Judge in Illinois
- Silas W. Lamoreaux, lawyer and politician
- Henry W. Lander, Wisconsin State Senator and Mayor of Beaver Dam
- Edward C. McFetridge, mayor of Beaver Dam
- George F. Merrill, Wisconsin State Senator
- Eric Oemig, former Washington State Senator
- Dick Pabich, LGBTQ activist and campaign manager of Harvey Milk
- Charles Pettibone, Wisconsin State Senator
- John Samuel Rowell, politician, agricultural inventor, and pioneer manufacturer
- Benjamin Sherman, Wisconsin legislator
- A. Scott Sloan, U.S. Representative
- John Mellen Thurston, U.S. Senator from Nebraska; Thurston County, Nebraska is named after him
- Philip J. Zink, Wisconsin legislator

=== Sports ===
- Eric Baldwin, professional poker player
- Paul Cloyd, professional basketball player
- Ric Flair, wrestler
- Pink Hawley, major league baseball player
- Addie Joss, MLB player, member of the National Baseball Hall of Fame
- Lyman Linde, MLB player
- Doug Lloyd, professional football player
- Jason Maas, professional football player
- David Maley, NHL player
- Bill Rentmeester, NFL/UFL player
- Elmer Rhenstrom, NFL player
- Gil Sterr, NFL player
- Barney Traynor, NFL player
- Randall Herbst, collegiate basketball coach

=== Business ===
- Stella B. Irvine (1859–1926), president, Southern California Woman's Christian Temperance Union
- Lina Trivedi, co-creator of Beanie Babies
- Frederick Douglas Underwood, president of Erie Railroad, director of Wells Fargo

=== Science, media, and the arts ===
- Delia Akeley, explorer
- Edward Creutz, physicist
- Brian Donlevy, actor
- Lois Ehlert, illustrator, Caldecott Medal recipient
- Zona Gale, writer
- Raymond Z. Gallun, writer
- Bobby Hatfield, singer, best known as one of The Righteous Brothers singing duo
- Fred MacMurray, actor
- Parry Moon, electrical engineer, author
- Kira Salak, writer, adventurer, journalist, attended Wayland Academy
- Nancy Zieman, television sewing host, author and businesswoman
