= Summerton Bog =

Bog and state natural area in Marquette County, Wisconsin

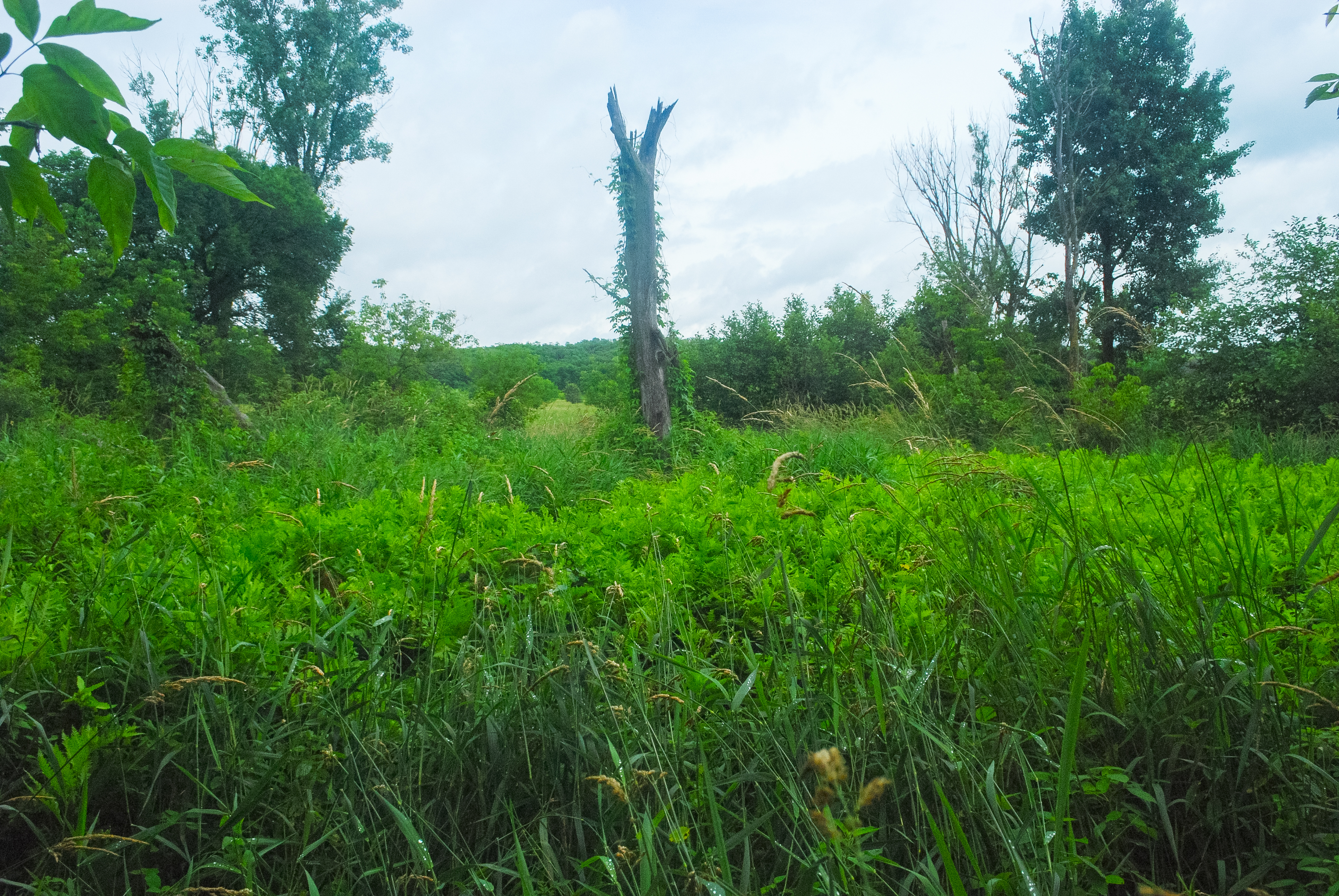
- Summerton Bog, June 2010

- Location within Wisconsin
- Location: Marquette County, Wisconsin
- Coordinates: 43°45′03″N 89°31′23″W
- Area: 451 acres (183 ha)
- Established: 1966
- Governing body: The Nature Conservancy
- Website: Official website

U.S. National Natural Landmark
- Designated: 1973

Summerton Bog is a bog in Marquette County, Wisconsin, United States. It provides a habitat for several rare species of plantlife and wildlife. It is owned by The Nature Conservancy and contains 428 acres (173 ha). The bog was designated a Wisconsin State Natural Area in 1966 and a National Natural Landmark in 1973.
