= Byron F. Wackett =

American politician

Byron F. Wackett (March 21, 1912 – May 17, 1980) was a member of the Wisconsin State Assembly.

== Biography ==
Wackett was born on March 21, 1912, in Randolph, Wisconsin.

== Career ==
Wackett served in the Assembly from 1953 to 1976. Previously, he had been mayor of Watertown, Wisconsin. Wackett operated a service station. He was a Republican. Wackett died on May 17, 1980.
