= Randall S. Knox =

American politician

Randall S. Knox (born August 30, 1949) is a former member of the Wisconsin State Assembly.

== Biography ==
Knox was born on August 30, 1949, in Madison, Wisconsin, United States. After graduating from high school in Fort Atkinson, Wisconsin, Knox received his bachelor's degree and law degrees from the University of Wisconsin-Madison. He is a lawyer and businessman. He had two children with his first wife.

== Career ==
Knox was first elected to the Assembly in a special election on January 31, 1980. Previously, he was a member of the Fort Atkinson City Council from 1975 to 1979. He is a Republican.
