= Immanuel Evangelical Lutheran Church (Mayville, Wisconsin) =

Church building in United States of America

Coordinates: 43°29′07.9″N 88°29′47.5″W

The Immanuel Evangelical Lutheran Church is a church in Mayville, Wisconsin, United States, formed by German immigrants, who arrived in Wisconsin from Nahausen, Prussia, in 1846. Immanuel is the second oldest congregation in the South Wisconsin District of the Lutheran Church–Missouri Synod.

The group officially organized as a congregation on May 24, 1847, with Pastor Geyer of Lebanon, Wisconsin, providing word and sacrament ministry. The church has no record of the organizational meeting or of the list of the charter members of the congregation, but land claims filed in October 1846 show following names: Friedrich Jagow, Johann Friedrich Fellwock, Michael Saase, Sr., Carl Jesse, Friedrich Schwann, Friedrich Kuehl, William Braasch, Gottlieb Braasch, Friedrich Christian, Carl Schwantes, Christlieb Schwantes, Michael Zimmermann, Michael Budahn, Wilhelm Milbrot, and Carl Bannenberg. The congregation in 1847 due to doctrinal controversy, and the two congregations (both retaining the name Immanuel) were distinguished from one another as the "lower church" and the "upper church" throughout much of their history. The lower church was also referred to as the "River Church" because of its location on the banks of the Rock River, and the upper church was nicknamed the "Hochheim" congregation. The two congregations remained separate for 103 years. After the Hochheim church was twice destroyed by fire, the congregations merged in 1957 at the "River Church" location.

Both congregations operated Christian Day Schools. The lower church officially opened its day school in 1855 and it has been in continual operation ever since.

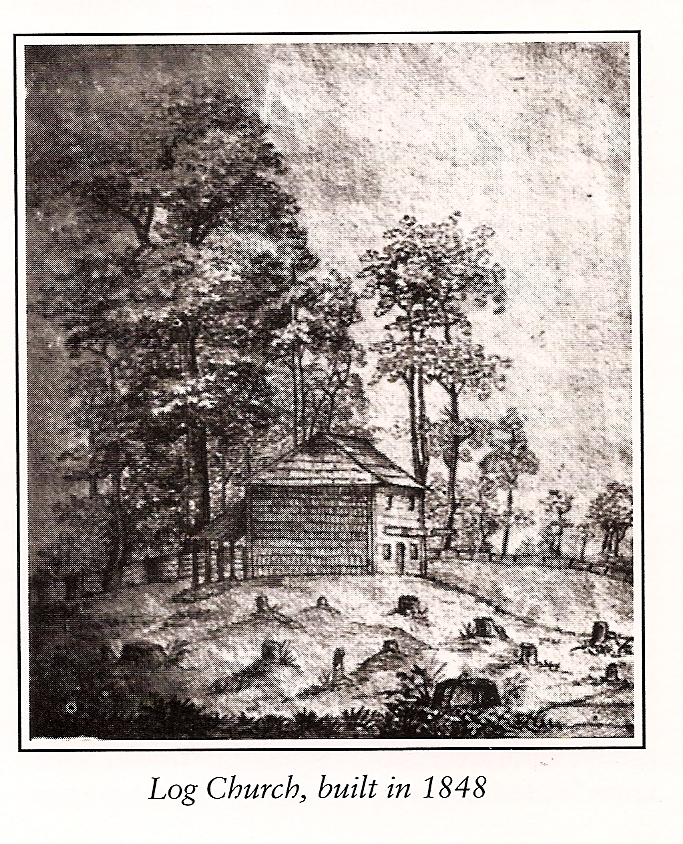
Art work depicting 1848 log church

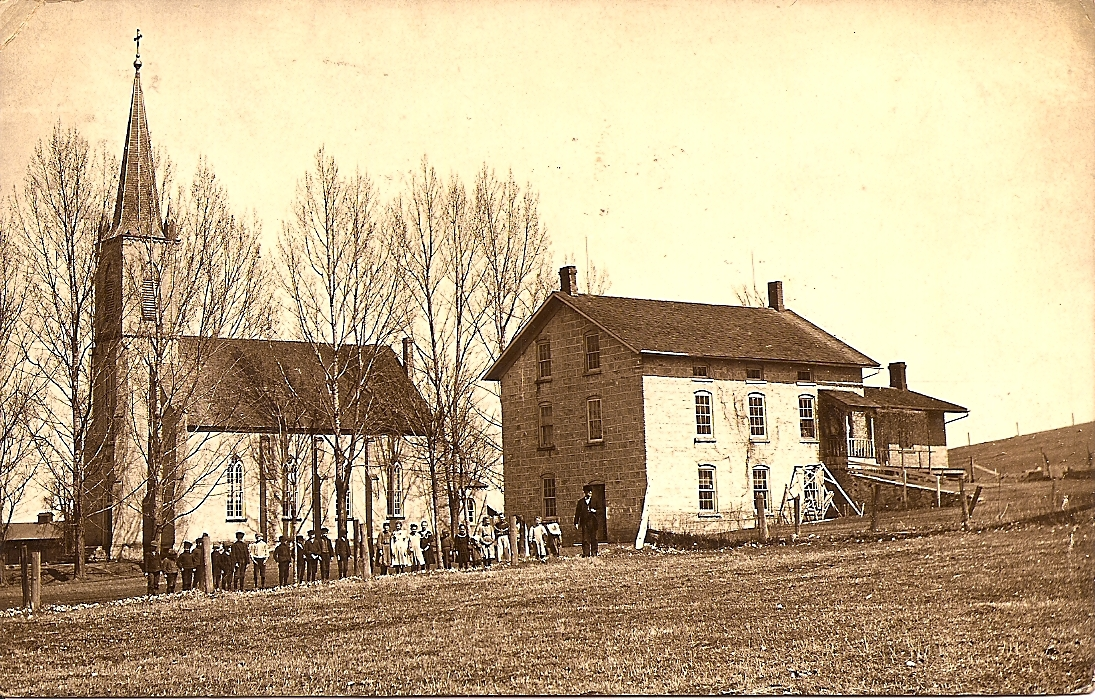
Immanuel, 19th century photo

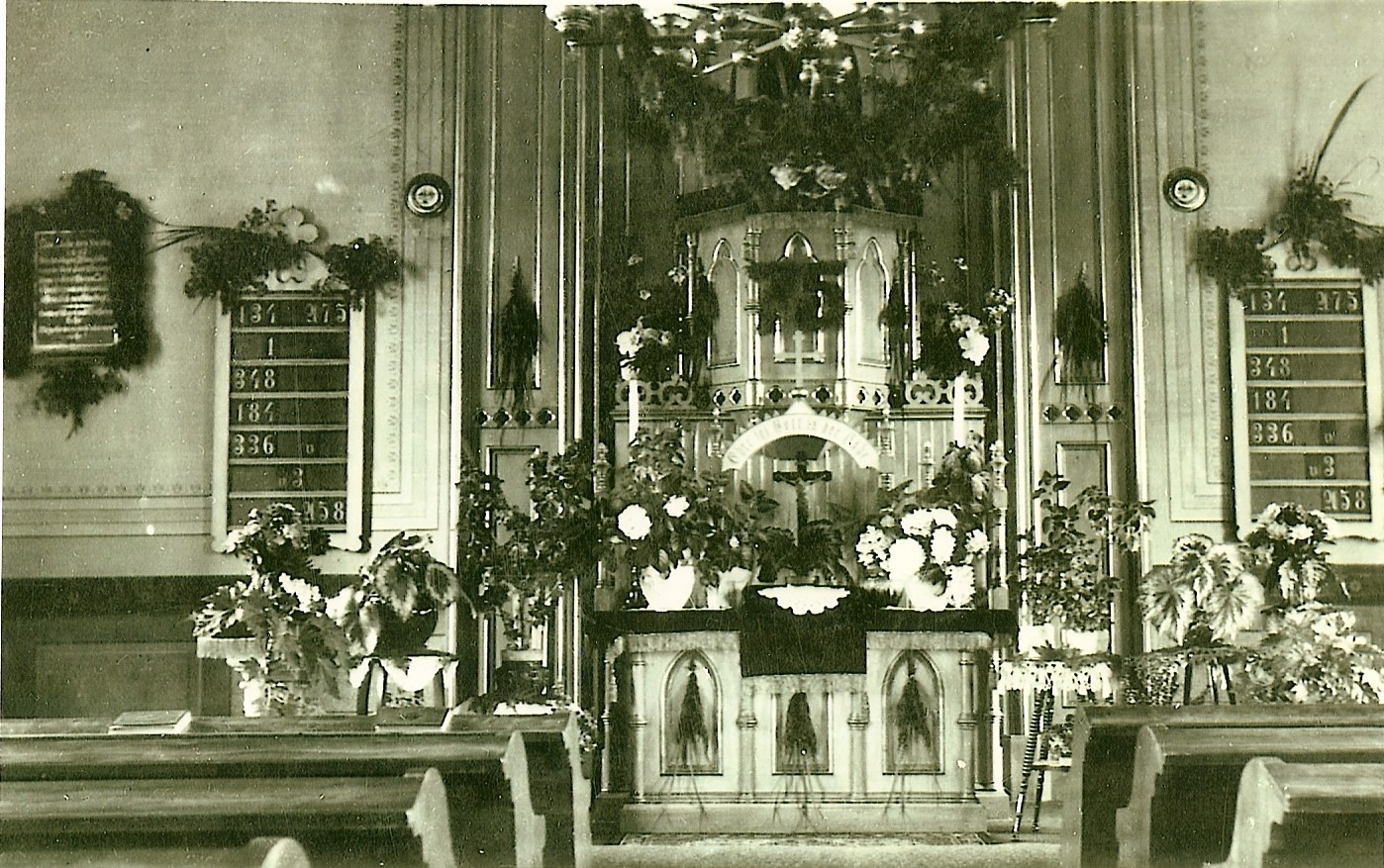
Pulpit-Altar at Immanuel, c 1922
