= John Koch (disambiguation) =

John Koch (1909–1978) was an American realist painter.

John Koch may also refer to:

- John A. B. Koch (1845–1928), German-born architect based in Australia
- John C. Koch (1841–1907), German-born politician, later Republican mayor of Milwaukee, Wisconsin, USA
- John Herman Koch (1864–1929), German-born American minister and politician
- John T. Koch, 20th-century American academic, historian and linguist
