= Hermann R. Fehland =

American politician

Hermann Reinhold Fehland (September 21, 1856 – January 14, 1907) was an American politician and businessman.

Born in the province of Brandenburg, Kingdom of Prussia, Fehland emigrated with his parents at six months old to the United States and settled in Mayville, Wisconsin. Fehland was involved with the hardware business. He then moved to Merrill, Wisconsin and continued to work in the hardware business: the H. R. Fehland & Company. Fehland was also involved with the National Bank of Merrill. Fehland served on the Merrill Common Council and as mayor of Merrill. He also served as county clerk for Lincoln County, Wisconsin. In 1887, Fehland served in the Wisconsin State Assembly and was a Democrat. Fehland died in Merrill, Wisconsin.
