= Beaumont Hotel (Mayville, Wisconsin) =

- U.S. National Register of Historic Places
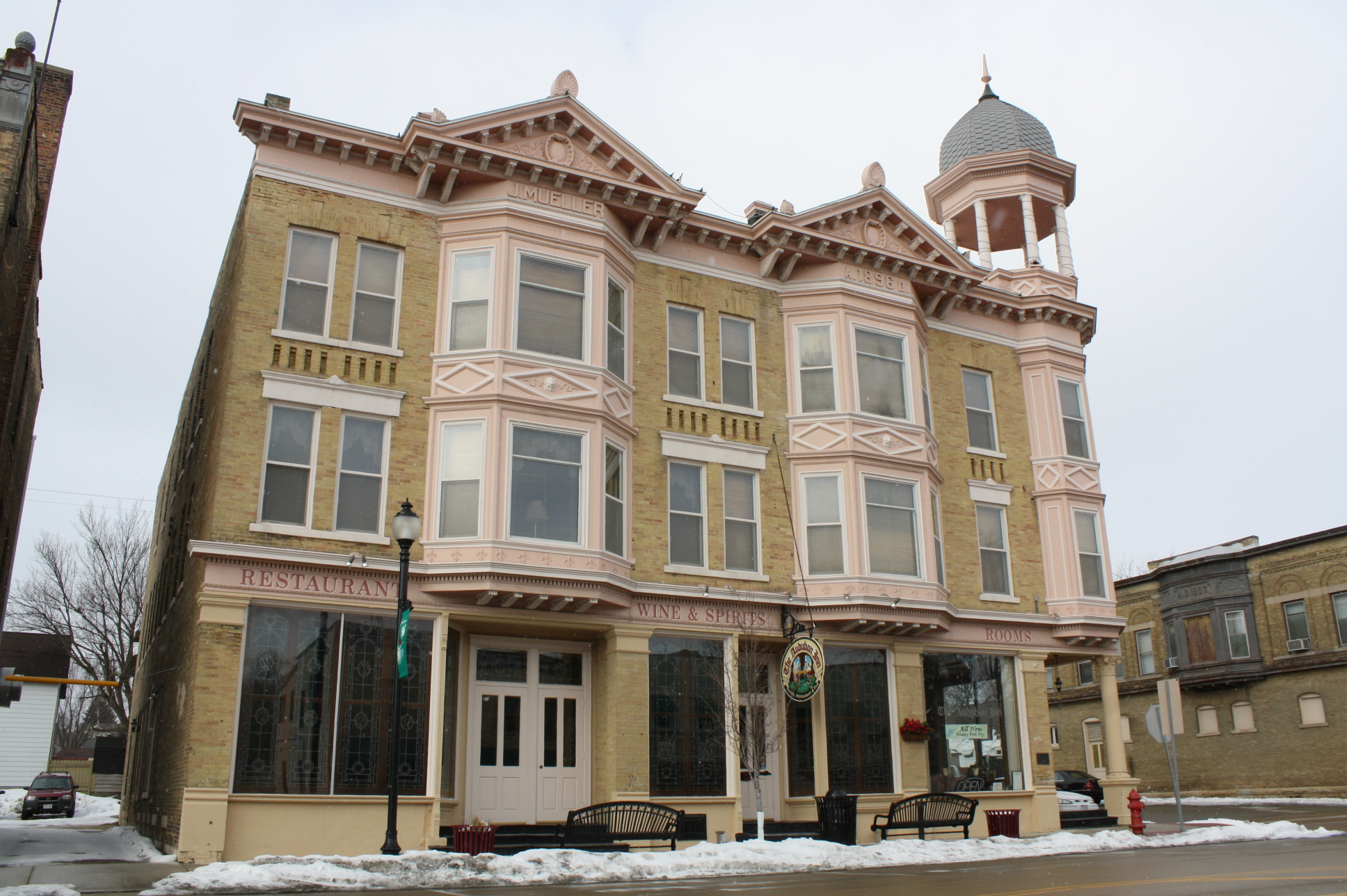
- Beaumont Hotel

- Location within Wisconsin Location within the United States
- Location: 45 Main St., Mayville, Wisconsin
- Coordinates: 43°29′48″N 88°32′40″W
- Area: less than one acre
- Built: 1896
- Architect: Henry Messmer & Son
- Architectural style: Queen Anne
- NRHP reference No.: 87002238
- Added to NRHP: January 13, 1988

The Beaumont Hotel is a historic hotel at 45 Main Street in Mayville, Wisconsin. Now known as the Audubon Inn, the building is listed on the National Register of Historic Places.

== History ==
The hotel was originally built for Jacob and Anna Mueller in 1896. Jacob Mueller published the Dodge County Pioneer, a German-language newspaper. Milwaukee-based architects Henry Messmer & Son designed the Queen Anne building, which is both one of the largest and most ornamental commercial buildings in Mayville. The three-story hotel's design includes several projecting bays with metal facades, pediments atop the projecting bays, an entablature and cornice with modillions and brackets, and a domed tower on the front corner. While it was not the first hotel in Mayville, as the American Hotel predated it, it was the largest, and a 1913 book of Dodge County history called it the best in the city. The Muellers owned the hotel until 1920, when they sold it to an investment group. Oscar and Florence Voss began operating the hotel in the 1920s and bought it outright in 1932; they owned and ran the hotel until 1968.

The hotel was listed on the National Register of Historic Places on January 13, 1988. It is located within the Main Street Historic District, which is also listed on the National Register.
