= Byron Barwig =

American politician (1862–1943)

Byron Barwig (July 29, 1862 – December 9, 1943) was a member of the Wisconsin State Senate.

== Biography ==
Barwig was born on July 29, 1862, in Milwaukee, Wisconsin. His father, Charles Barwig, became a member of the United States House of Representatives. In 1865, Barwig moved with his parents to Mayville, Wisconsin. On November 30, 1892, he married Mary Rahlfs. They had three children. Barwig died on December 9, 1943. He was buried in Mayville.

== Career ==
Barwig was elected to the Senate in 1914. Previously, he was Mayor of Mayville and delegate to the 1908 Democratic National Convention.
