= Main Street Historic District (Mayville, Wisconsin) =

Historic district in Wisconsin, United States

- U.S. National Register of Historic Places
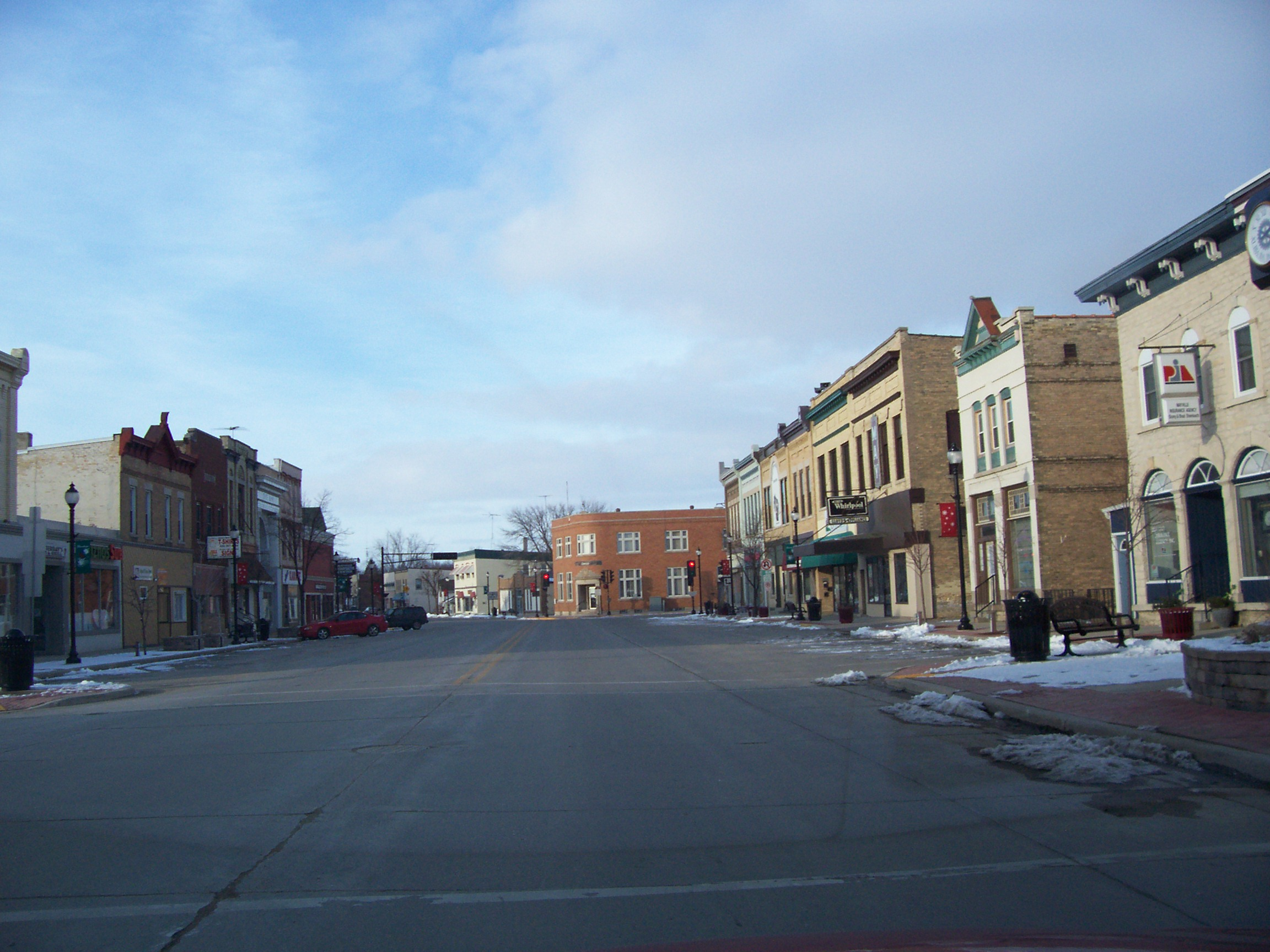
- A portion of the district.
- Location: Roughly, 103 N. Main St.--126 S. Main St. and Bridge St. from Main to School St., Mayville, Wisconsin
- Area: 7 acres (2.8 ha)
- NRHP reference No.: 95000443
- Added to NRHP: April 14, 1995

The Main Street Historic District is located in Mayville, Wisconsin.

== History ==
The district is Mayville's old downtown. Buildings within it include the Beaumont Hotel, along with the 1866 Italianate Reible building, the pre-1873 Commercial Vernacular Simonin-Wolff-Faust Building, the 1891 Classical Revival Ruedebusch Department Store, the 1897 Queen Anne Hamm building, and the 1915 Modernist First National Bank.

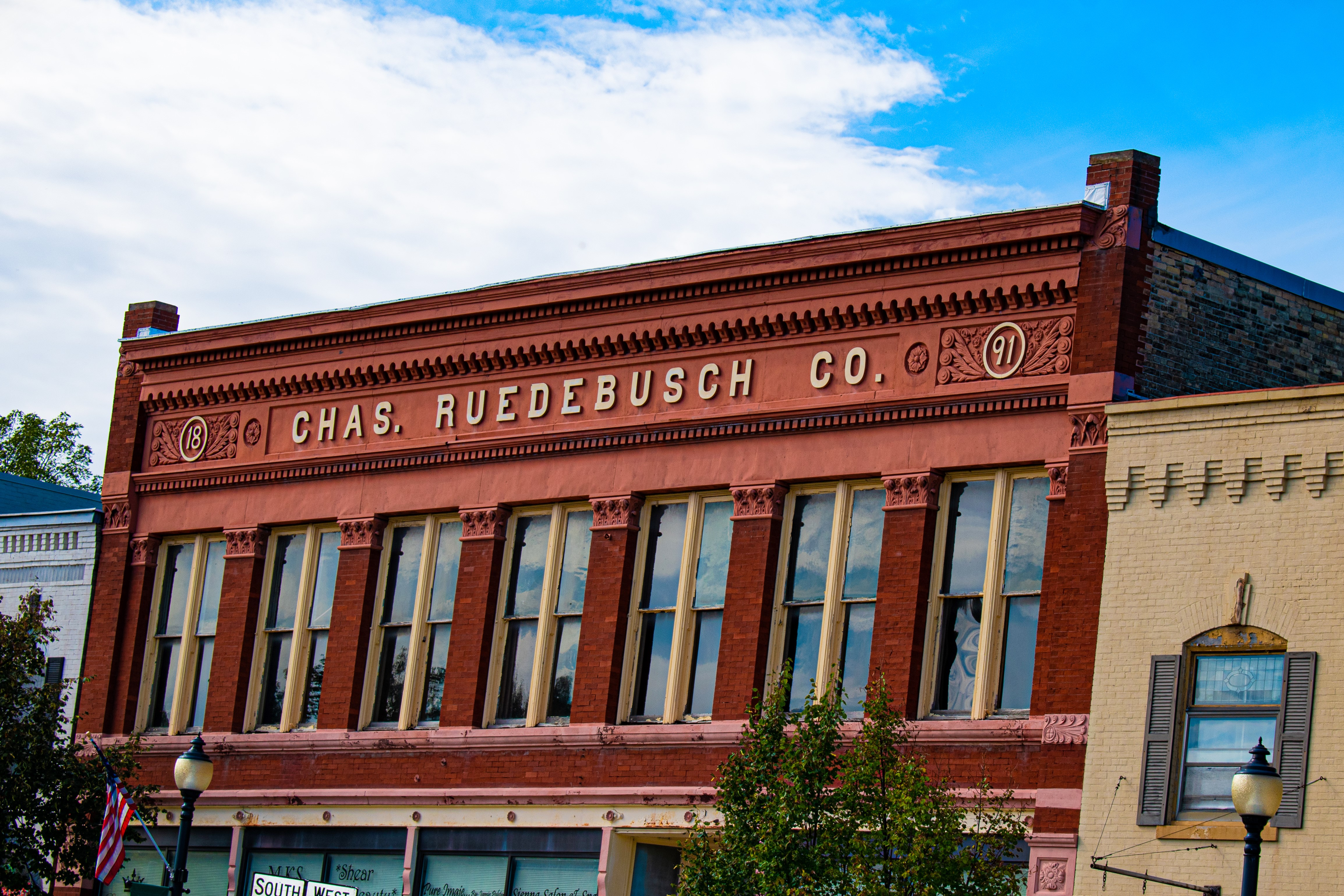
Ruedebusch Department Store
