= Immanuel Lutheran School, Mayville, Wisconsin =

School in United States of America

Coordinates: 43°29′05.8″N 88°29′49.5″W

Immanuel Lutheran School
- Mayville, Wisconsin; United States

Information
- Type: Private
- Religious affiliation: LCMS
- Established: 1855
- Staff: 4
- Grades: PK–12
- Enrollment: 23
- Language: English
- Website: immanuelmayville.com/school.php

Immanuel Lutheran School was founded in 1855 and is one of the oldest continually operating elementary schools in the state of Wisconsin.

In the 2013–2014 school year, Immanuel's Kindergarten class scored higher than 99% of schools in the nation on the Iowa Test of Basic Skills.
