= Charles Barwig =

American politician (1837–1912)

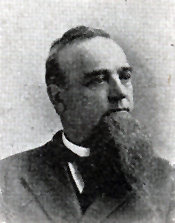

Member of the U.S. House of Representatives from Wisconsin's 2nd district
- In office March 4, 1889 – March 3, 1895
- Preceded by: Richard W. Guenther
- Succeeded by: Edward Sauerhering

Personal details
- Born: March 19, 1837 Hesse-Darmstadt, German Confederation
- Died: February 15, 1912 (aged 74) Mayville, Wisconsin, U.S.
- Resting place: Graceland Cemetery, Mayville, Wisconsin
- Party: Democratic
- Spouse: Elizabeth Schwartzburg (m. 1857–1908)
- Children: Emelia (Schwartz)^{(b. 1857; died 1940)}; Carl A. Barwig^{(b. 1859; died 1937)}; Byron Barwig^{(b. 1862; died 1943)}; George Blanchard Barwig^{(b. 1864; died 1923)}; Robert Homer Barwig^{(b. 1869; died 1917)}

Charles Barwig (March 19, 1837 – February 15, 1912) was a German American immigrant, businessman, and Democratic politician from Dodge County, Wisconsin. He served three terms in the U.S. House of Representatives, representing east-central Wisconsin from 1889 to 1895. Before his service in Congress, he served two years as mayor of Mayville, Wisconsin.

His son, Byron Barwig, also became mayor of Mayville, and represented Dodge County in the Wisconsin Senate.

== Biography ==
Born in Hesse-Darmstadt in the German Confederation, Barwig immigrated to the United States in 1845 with his parents, who settled in Milwaukee, Wisconsin Territory. He attended the public schools and graduated from the Spencerian Business College in Milwaukee in 1857.

He moved to Mayville, Wisconsin, in 1865 and engaged in the wholesale liquor business. He served as mayor of Mayville from 1886 until 1888.

Barwig was elected as a Democrat to the Fifty-first, Fifty-second, and Fifty-third Congresses (March 4, 1889 – March 3, 1895) as the representative of Wisconsin's 2nd congressional district. He served as chairman of the Committee on Expenditures in the Department of the Treasury (Fifty-third Congress). He was an unsuccessful candidate for reelection in 1894 to the Fifty-fourth Congress.

He engaged in the real estate business.

He died in Mayville, Wisconsin, on February 15, 1912, and was interred in Mayville's Graceland Cemetery.

Barwig's son, Byron Barwig, also served as mayor of Mayville and was elected to the Wisconsin State Senate.

== Sources ==
- United States Congress. "Charles Barwig (id: B000218)". Biographical Directory of the United States Congress.

U.S. House of Representatives
Preceded by Richard W. Guenther	Member of the U.S. House of Representatives from Wisconsin's 2nd congressional district March 4, 1889 – March 3, 1895	Succeeded by Edward Sauerhering
