= White Limestone School =

- U.S. National Register of Historic Places
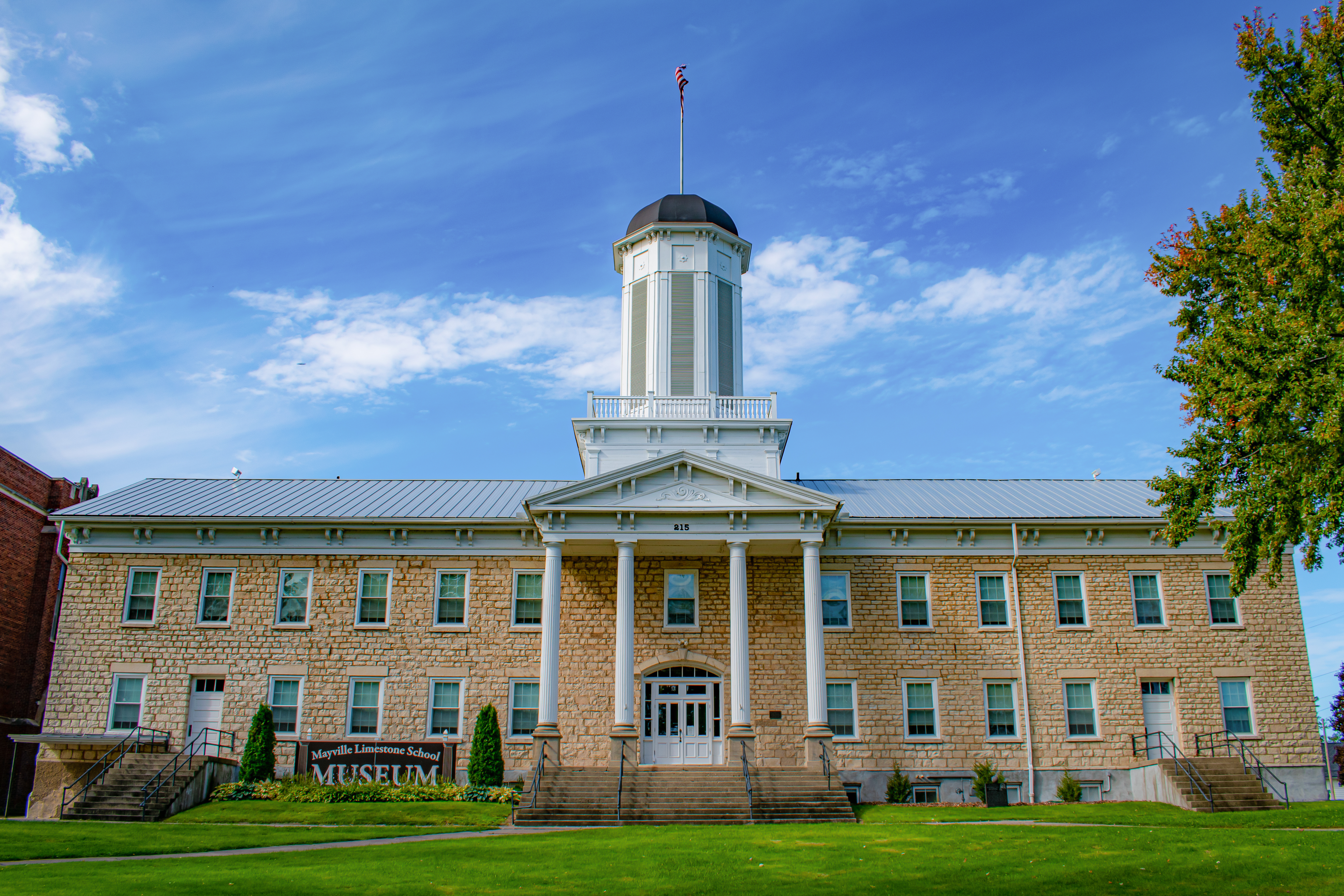
- White Limestone School

- Location within Wisconsin Location within the United States
- Location: N. Main St. between Dayton and Buchanan Sts., Mayville, Wisconsin
- Coordinates: 43°29′54″N 88°32′46″W
- Area: 0.3 acres (0.12 ha)
- Built: 1857-1858/1876-1877
- Architect: Friedrich Fischer (additions)
- Architectural style: Greek Revival
- NRHP reference No.: 76000057
- Added to NRHP: October 22, 1976

The White Limestone School is located in Mayville, Wisconsin.

== History ==
The school was constructed from 1858 to 1957 to replace the previous one and serve the city's growing population. During the 1870s, with the population still growing, major additions built. During various times in the school's history, it taught all grades ranging from kindergarten through all four years of high school. The building ceased being used as a school in 1981. It has since been converted into a museum.
