= Edward Sauerhering =

19th century American politician (1864–1924)

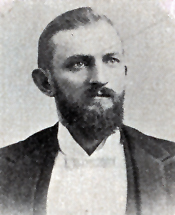

Member of the U.S. House of Representatives from Wisconsin's 2nd district
- In office March 4, 1895 – March 3, 1899
- Preceded by: Charles Barwig
- Succeeded by: Herman Dahle

Personal details
- Born: June 24, 1864 Mayville, Wisconsin, U.S.
- Died: March 1, 1924 (aged 59) Mayville, Wisconsin, U.S.
- Resting place: Saint Marys Catholic Cemetery, Mayville
- Party: Republican
- Spouse: Eugenia Langenbach (m. 1885–1924)
- Children: Carl E. Sauer^{(b. 1890; died 1949)}; Adolph "Pete" Sauer^{(b. 1892; died 1964)}; Louise M. (Hartwig)^{(b. 1899; died 1979)}
- Parent: Rudolf Sauerhering (father)
- Education: Chicago College of Pharmacy
- Profession: Pharmacist

Edward Sauerhering (June 24, 1864 – March 1, 1924) was a German American pharmacist and Republican politician from Dodge County, Wisconsin. He was a member of the U.S. House of Representatives for two terms, representing Wisconsin's 2nd congressional district during the 54th and 55th congresses (1895–1899). He was author of one of the first significant dairy laws in Congress, placing taxes and regulations on pseudo-dairy products like margarine. His father, Rudolf Sauerhering, was the first village president of Mayville, Wisconsin.

== Early life and education ==
Edward Sauerhering was born in Mayville, Wisconsin, on June 24, 1864. He attended public schools in Mayville until age 16, when he went to work at his father's drug store. He went on to attend the Chicago College of Pharmacy, where he graduated in 1885.

After graduating, he worked in the drug business for three years in Chicago before returning to Mayville.

== Political career ==
Around this time, Sauerhering became active in politics with the Republican Party of Wisconsin. As a German Catholic Republican, Sauerhering was a demographic outlier in 1890s Wisconsin. The German American population was generally split by religious denomination, with Protestants favoring the Republicans and Catholics favoring the Democrats. In the early 1890s, however, the German American population in Wisconsin was mostly unified against the Republican Party due to a compulsory English-language education law, passed as part of a larger education law referred to as the "Bennett Law" in the 1889 legislature. The issue was then exacerbated by some comments from the Republican Governor that were interpreted as xenophobic and anti-Catholic.

In 1891 Sauerhering was nominated on the Republican Party slate for Mayville city council but was not elected. In 1892, Sauerhering was elected chairman of the Dodge County Republican Party. That fall, he was the Republican nominee for Wisconsin State Assembly in Dodge County's 1st Assembly district—comprising roughly the northeast quarter of the county. Nominations in 1892 were unusually late due to litigation over redistricting. Sauerhering officially received the nomination on October 22, seventeen days before the election. Sauerhering faced Democratic incumbent Bennett Sampson in the general election, and lost by nearly a 2-to-1 margin.

Undaunted, the next spring, Sauerhering ran for mayor of Mayville, but lost to Carl A. Barwig, son of congressman Charles Barwig.

Wisconsin's 2nd congressional district 1892–1901

Sauerhering, as chairman of the Dodge County Republicans, appeared at the 2nd congressional district convention in 1894 to organize a ticket. In the 1890s, Wisconsin's 2nd congressional district comprised Dane, Dodge, Columbia, and Jefferson counties, in south-central Wisconsin. The delegates' preferred candidate, Jefferson County state representative George Grimm, refused the congressional nomination; the convention eventually chose Sauerhering instead, some newspapers speculated that this was because Sauerhering was from the same city as the Democratic incumbent, Barwig.

Sauerhering faced the incumbent, Charles Barwig, in the general election. The political mood had turned decisively against the Democrats in 1894, due to fallout from the Panic of 1893, which Republicans blamed on Democratic free trade policies. A Republican wave saw Republicans gain 104 seats in the U.S. House of Representatives. Sauerhering prevailed in one of the closest races in the country, defeating Barwig by just 265 votes. Sauerhering won a second term by a wide margin 1896, defeating former Madison mayor William H. Rogers. His chief accomplishment in Congress was passage of an act defining cheese as a pure dairy product without addition of other animal fats or vegetable oils. The act also placed taxes and regulations on margarine and other "filled cheese" products. He declined to run again in 1898, returning to his family drug store.

== Later years ==
After leaving office, Sauerhering mostly focused on his drug business, but held local office. He was Mayville's superintendent of public works from 1909 to 1918, during which time he played a role in the construction of a new waterworks in the city. He also served as a justice of the peace from 1912 to 1920.

Sauerhering died at his home in Mayvile on March 1, 1924, after five years of illness. He was interred at Mayville's Graceland Cemetery.

== Personal life and family ==
Edward Sauerhering was one of five children born to Rudolf Sauerhering and his wife Henrietta (née Hartwig). Both parents were German American immigrants from East Prussia (present day Poland). Rudolf Sauerhering was the first village president of Mayville; he and his brother, Adolph Sauerhering, where both pharmacists educated at the University of Königsberg. They came to Wisconsin in the early 1850s and were among the first drug store operators in eastern Dodge County.

Edward Sauerhering married Eugenia Langenbach on June 29, 1889. Eugenia was also a first generation American and a child of German emigrants. They had three children together. Their son, Adolph, served in the United States Army during World War I. Both sons eventually adopted the shortened surname "Sauer".

== Electoral history ==
=== Wisconsin Assembly (1892) ===
Year	Election	Date	Elected				Defeated				Total	Plurality
1892	General	Nov. 8	Bennett Sampson (inc)	Democratic	2,113	66.01%	Edward Sauerhering	Rep.	1,088	33.99%	3,201	1,025

=== Mayville Mayor (1893) ===
Year	Election	Date	Elected				Defeated				Total	Plurality
1893	General	Apr. 4	Carl A. Barwig	Democratic	164	58.99%	Edward Sauerhering	Rep.	114	41.01%	278	50

=== U.S. House (1894, 1896) ===
Year	Election	Date	Elected				Defeated				Total	Plurality
1894	General	Nov. 6	Edward Sauerhering	Republican	18,197	47.87%	Charles Barwig (inc)	Dem.	17,932	47.17%	38,017	265
1894	General	Nov. 6	Edward Sauerhering	Republican	18,197	47.87%	J. J. Sutton	Proh.	1,433	3.77%	38,017	265
1894	General	Nov. 6	Edward Sauerhering	Republican	18,197	47.87%	B. W. Hewitt	Peo.	120	1.20%	38,017	265
1896	General	Nov. 3	Edward Sauerhering (inc)	Republican	24,011	56.48%	William H. Rogers	Dem.	17,480	41.11%	42,516	6,531
1896	General	Nov. 3	Edward Sauerhering (inc)	Republican	24,011	56.48%	Jesse Meyers	Proh.	1,025	2.41%	42,516	6,531

U.S. House of Representatives
Preceded by Charles Barwig	Member of the U.S. House of Representatives from Wisconsin's 2nd congressional district 1895 – 1899	Succeeded by Herman B. Dahle
