= John Herman Koch =

American politician

John Herman Koch (July 24, 1864 – August 28, 1929) was an American politician and minister. He served in the Wisconsin State Assembly.

== Biography ==
A German emigrant Koch was born on July 24, 1864. He settled with his parents near Mayville, Wisconsin, in 1870 and in Hartland, Shawano County, Wisconsin, in 1873. Koch later became a Lutheran minister and missionary. He died on August 28, 1929, in Milwaukee County, Wisconsin, and was buried in Milwaukee, Wisconsin.

== Political career ==
Koch was elected to the Assembly in 1922. He was a Republican.
