= Mayville, Wisconsin =

- City
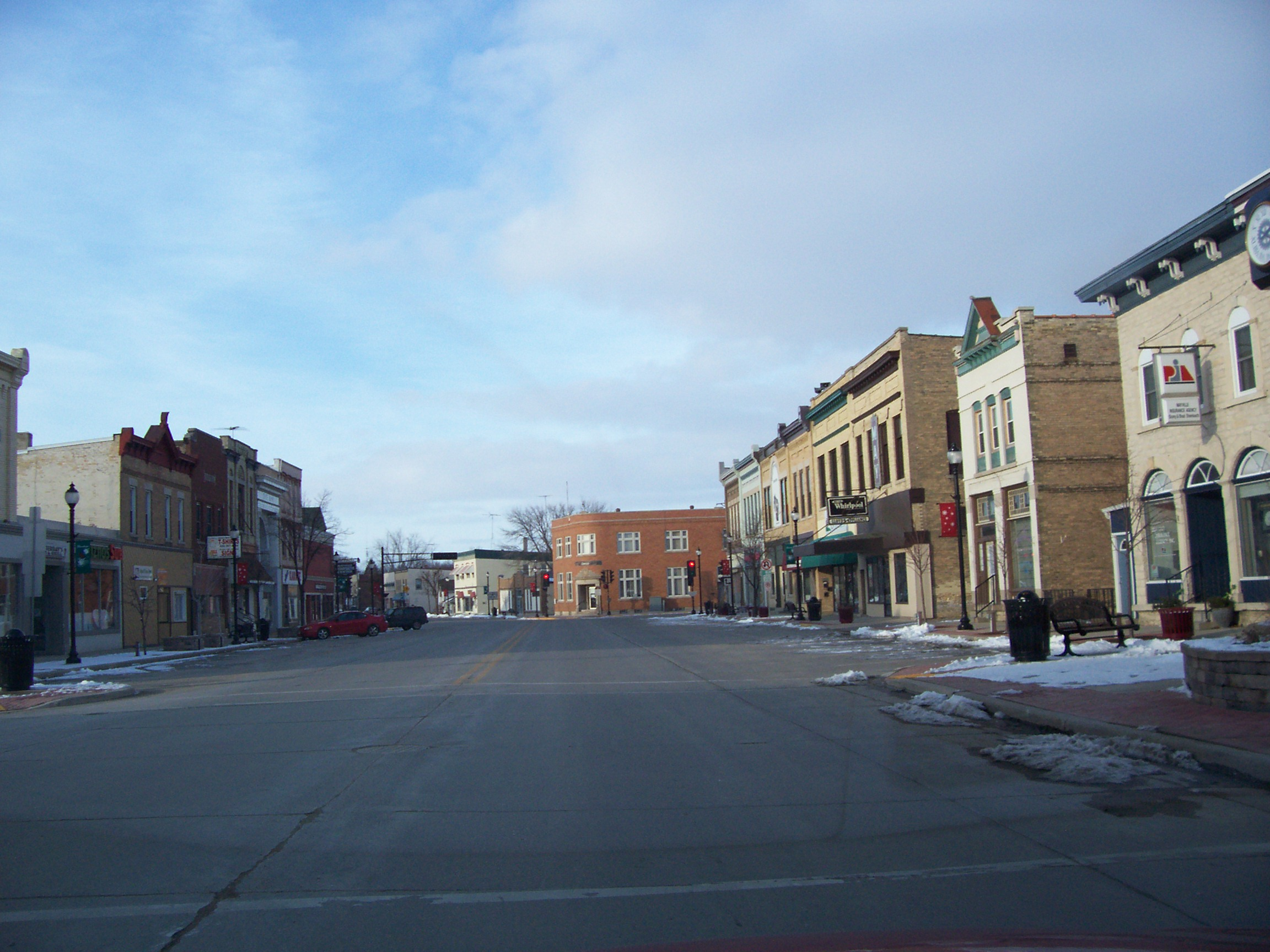
- Main Street Historic District

- Location of Mayville in Dodge County, Wisconsin.

- Location within Wisconsin Location within the United States
- Coordinates: 43°29′49″N 88°32′52″W
- Country: United States
- State: Wisconsin
- County: Dodge

Area
  - Total: 3.37 sq mi (8.72 km^{2})
  - Land: 3.25 sq mi (8.43 km^{2})
  - Water: 0.12 sq mi (0.30 km^{2})
- Elevation: 929 ft (283 m)

Population (2020)
  - Total: 5,196
  - Density: 1,600/sq mi (616/km^{2})
- Time zone: UTC-6 (Central (CST))
  - Summer (DST): UTC-5 (CDT)
- ZIP Code: 53050
- Area code: 920
- FIPS code: 55-50200
- GNIS feature ID: 1569151
- Website: mayvillecity.com

Mayville is a city in Dodge County, Wisconsin, United States, located along the Rock River and the Horicon Marsh. The population was 5,196 at the 2020 census.

== History ==
Mayville was platted in 1845, by the May brothers and others, and named for the former. A post office has been in operation at Mayville since 1847. The city was incorporated in 1885.

== Geography ==
Mayville is located at 43°29′49″N 88°32′52″W (43.497044, -88.547871).

According to the United States Census Bureau, the city has a total area of 3.28 square miles (8.50 km^{2}), of which 3.17 square miles (8.21 km^{2}) is land and 0.11 square miles (0.28 km^{2}) is water.

== Demographics ==
Historical population
Census	Pop.	Note	%±
1880	1,051		—
1890	1,165		10.8%
1900	1,815		55.8%
1910	2,282		25.7%
1920	3,011		31.9%
1930	2,521		−16.3%
1940	2,754		9.2%
1950	3,010		9.3%
1960	3,607		19.8%
1970	4,139		14.7%
1980	4,333		4.7%
1990	4,374		0.9%
2000	4,902		12.1%
2010	5,154		5.1%
2020	5,196		0.8%
U.S. Decennial Census

=== 2010 census ===
As of the census of 2010, there were 5,155 people, 2,172 households, and 1,404 families living in the city. The population density was 1,625.9 inhabitants per square mile (627.8/km^{2}). There were 2,321 housing units at an average density of 732.2 per square mile (282.7/km^{2}). The racial makeup of the city was 96.6% White, 0.2% African American, 0.2% Native American, 0.6% Asian, 1.4% from other races, and 1.0% from two or more races. Hispanic or Latino of any race were 2.7% of the population.

There were 2,172 households, of which 30.6% had children under the age of 18 living with them, 49.5% were married couples living together, 9.8% had a female householder with no husband present, 5.4% had a male householder with no wife present, and 35.3% were non-families. 29.7% of all households were made up of individuals, and 12.8% had someone living alone who was 65 years of age or older. The average household size was 2.33 and the average family size was 2.87.

The median age in the city was 41.1 years. 23.6% of residents were under the age of 18; 7% were between the ages of 18 and 24; 25% were from 25 to 44; 27.8% were from 45 to 64; and 16.7% were 65 years of age or older. The gender makeup of the city was 49.4% male and 50.6% female.

=== 2000 census ===
As of the census of 2000, there were 4,902 people, 1,988 households, and 1,329 families living in the city. The population density was 1,574.4 people per square mile (608.6/km^{2}). There were 2,081 housing units at an average density of 668.4 per square mile (258.4/km^{2}). The racial makeup of the city was 98.35% White, 0.08% African American, 0.20% Native American, 0.29% Asian, 0.73% from other races, and 0.35% from two or more races. Hispanic or Latino of any race were 1.45% of the population.

There were 1,988 households, out of which 33.6% had children under the age of 18 living with them, 55.3% were married couples living together, 7.6% had a female householder with no husband present, and 33.1% were non-families. 29.8% of all households were made up of individuals, and 14.3% had someone living alone who was 65 years of age or older. The average household size was 2.42 and the average family size was 3.02.

In the city, the population was spread out, with 25.8% under the age of 18, 7.0% from 18 to 24, 30.3% from 25 to 44, 19.4% from 45 to 64, and 17.4% who were 65 years of age or older. The median age was 38 years. For every 100 females, there were 98.9 males. For every 100 females age 18 and over, there were 93.8 males.

The median income for a household in the city was $42,393, and the median income for a family was $50,789. Males had a median income of $36,412 versus $25,500 for females. The per capita income for the city was $19,644. About 4.6% of families and 5.7% of the population were below the poverty line, including 5.7% of those under age 18 and 11.4% of those age 65 or over.

== Economy ==
Mayville is home to several large manufacturing facilities, including plants operated by TAB Products, Mayvile Die and Tool, Mayville Products Corporation, Metalcraft, Mayville Engineering Company, Affiliated Products, RCI Engineering and Gleason Reel, a subsidiary of Hubbell Corporation. Dairy farming and other agricultural activities also comprise an important part of the local economy.

== Arts and culture ==
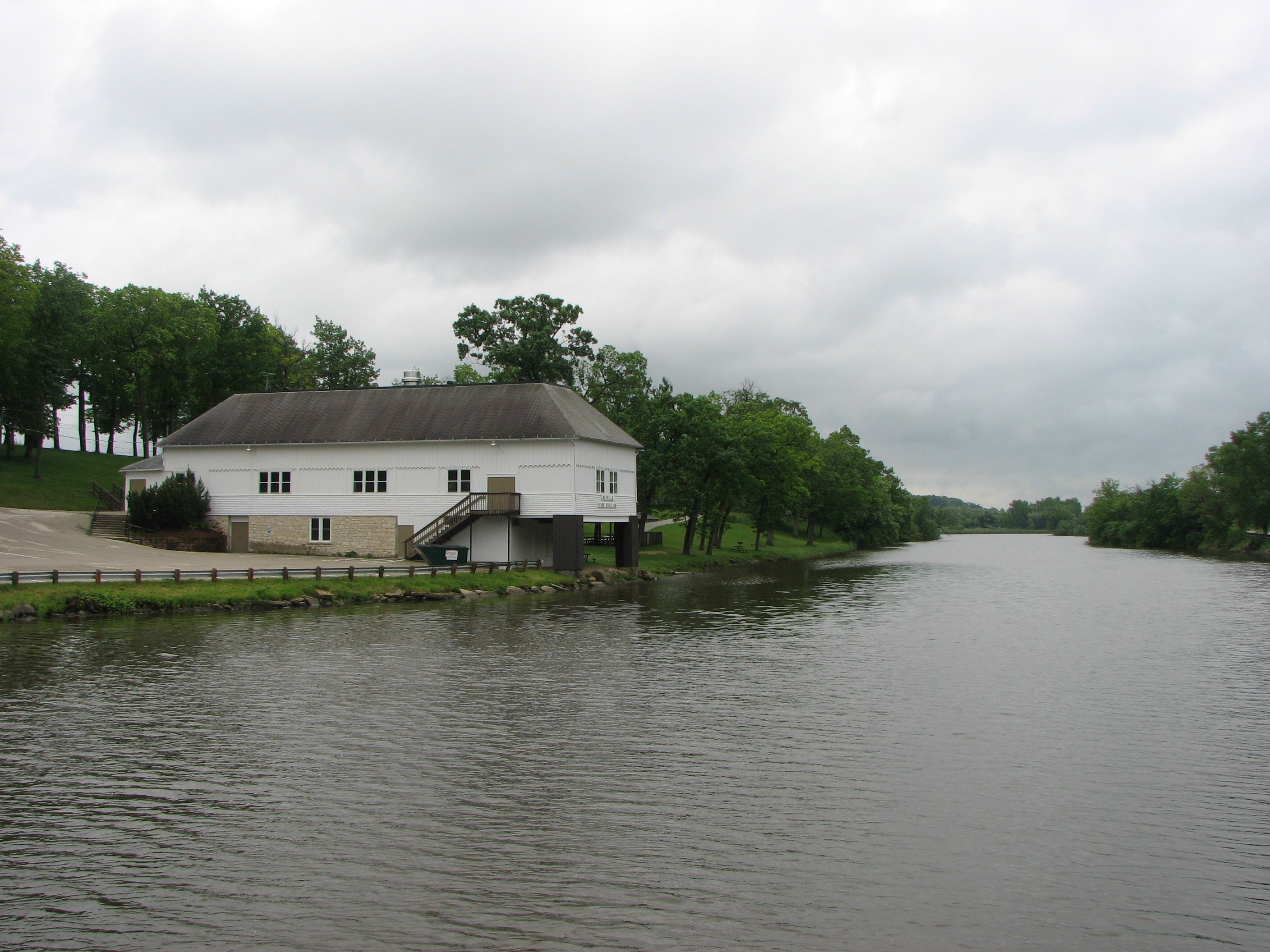
Park Pavilion building along the Rock River in Mayville, Wisconsin

Mayville hosts an annual "Audubon Days" festival the first full weekend of October. Audubon Days is a culmination of Mayville's historic German roots, with festivities that include bed races, the "Taste of Mayville" food tent, duck races, a parade, kids games/crafts and live music.

From July 29 to August 2, 2009, Mayville hosted the Wisconsin American Legion Baseball Class A state tournament at Fireman's Field in Mayville. Fireman's Field is widely thought of as a difficult venue to play baseball games at, due to the hill in left field.

Fireman's field is maintained by the city of Mayville, and has become a destination for many high profiled sporting events. These events include the aforementioned 2009 Wisconsin American Legion Baseball State Tournament. Mayville was also named one of the four sectional sites for the WIAA Division 2 State Baseball Playoffs. Fireman's Field was also host the 2010 Junior State Legion Baseball Tournament.

Mayville is the hometown of screenwriter Rob Schrab, who wrote the screenplay for the 2006 animated film Monster House. Schrab set the movie in a fictional version of Mayville.

== Notable people ==
- State Representative Albert B. Barney.
- State Senator Byron Barwig.
- U.S. Representative Charles Barwig.
- State Senator Ezra A. Bowen.
- State Representative Arthur Delaney
- State Representative Hermann R. Fehland.
- State Representative Elmer L. Genzmer.
- State Representative Rick Gudex
- State Senator Oscar Clark Hathaway.
- MLB player Bert Husting.
- U.S. Senator Paul O. Husting.
- State Representative Charles E. Kite.
- Reverend and State Representative John Herman Koch.
- State Representative Charles Lentz.
- U.S. Representative Edward Sauerhering.
- Comic book artist, actor, writer, director and film producer Rob Schrab grew up in Mayville.
- State Representative Henry Spiering

== Images ==
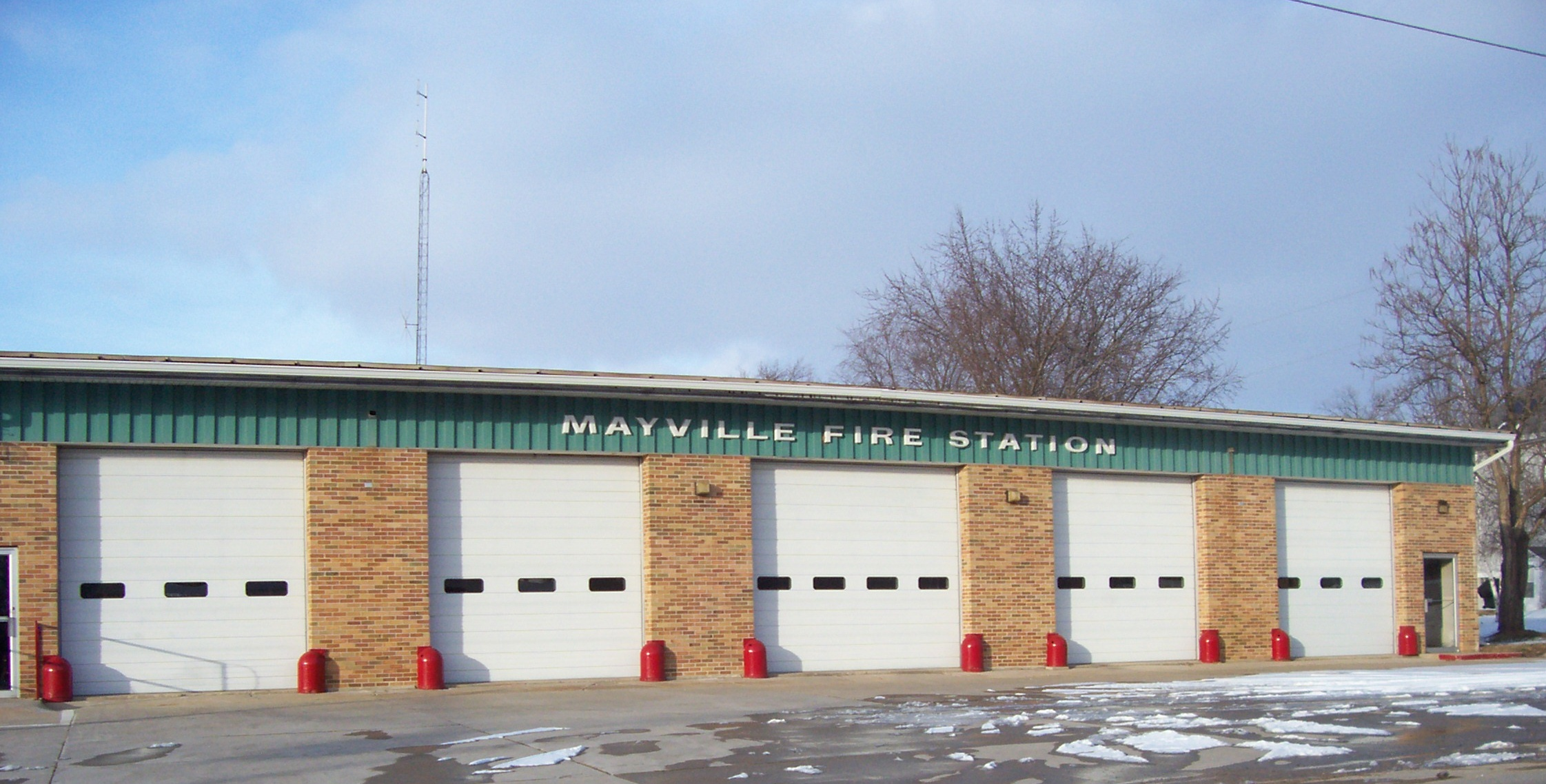
Fire station

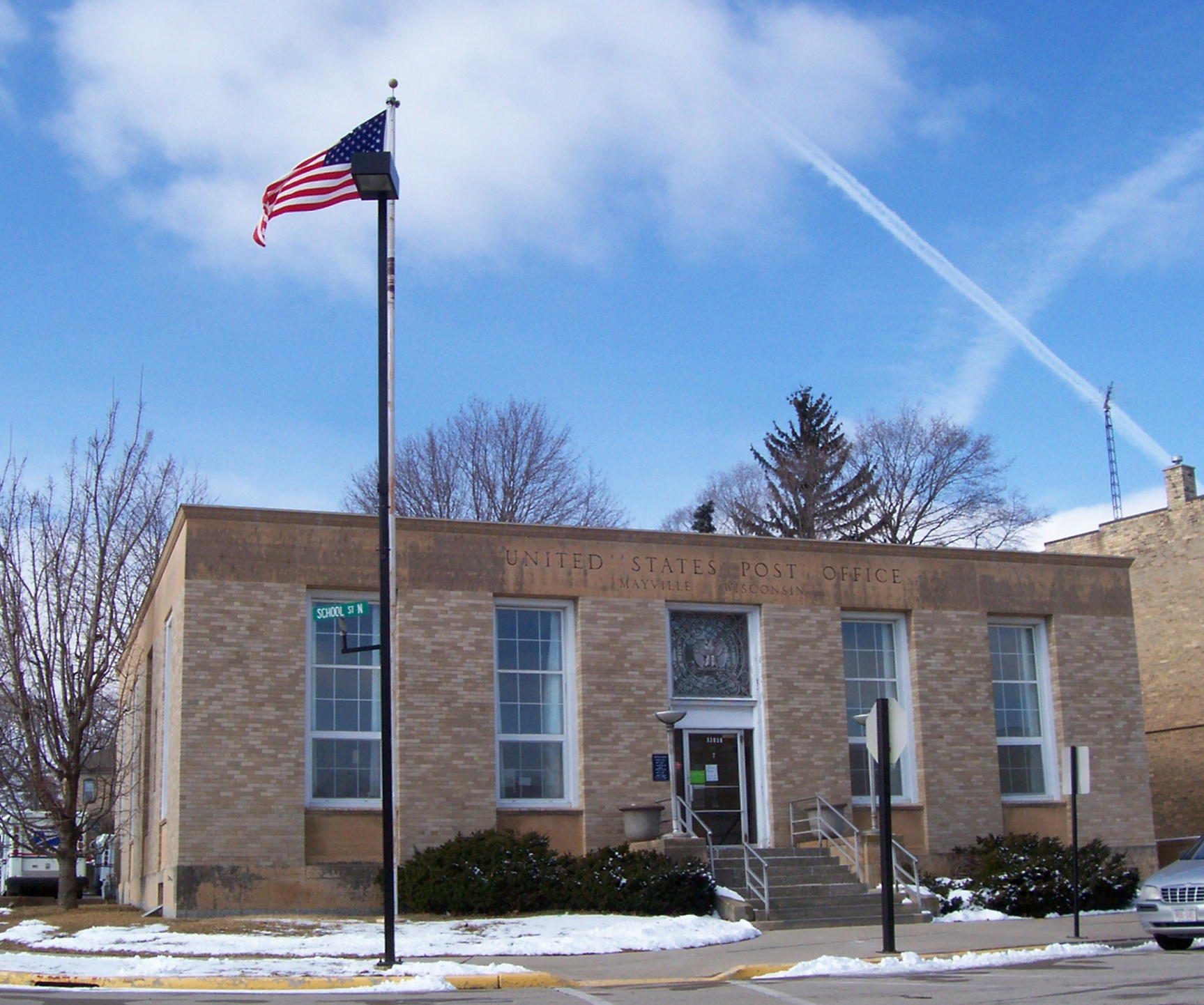
Post office

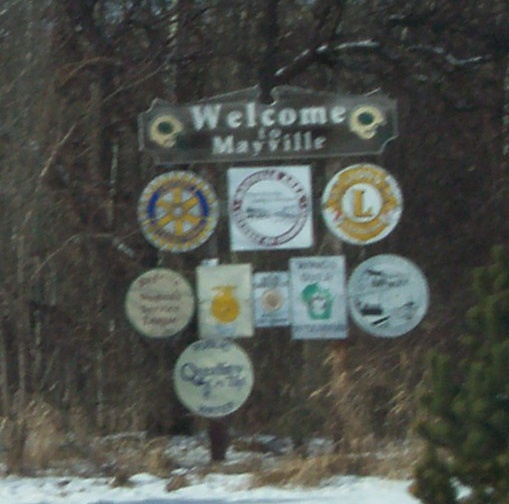
Welcome sign

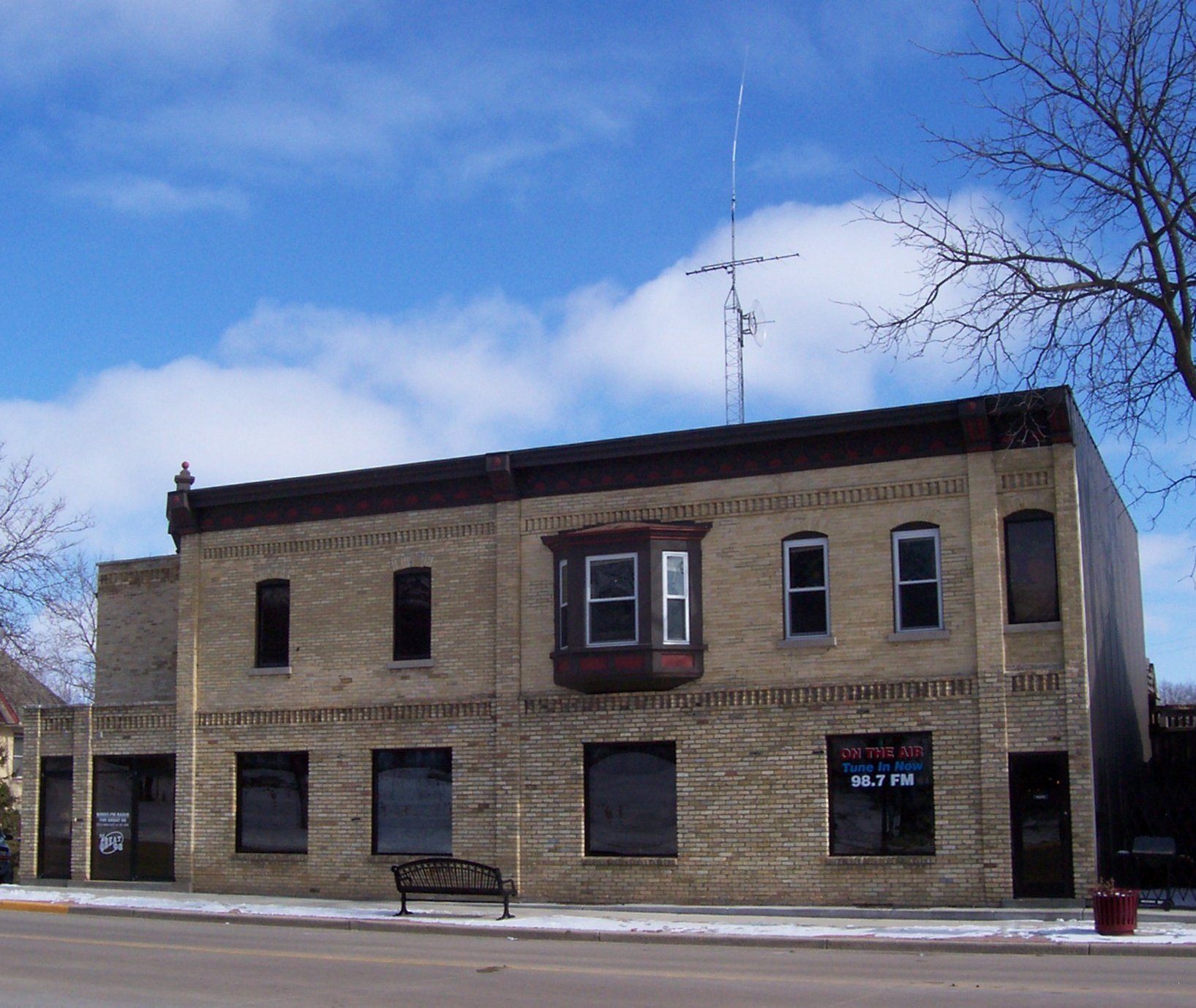
WMDC (FM) studios

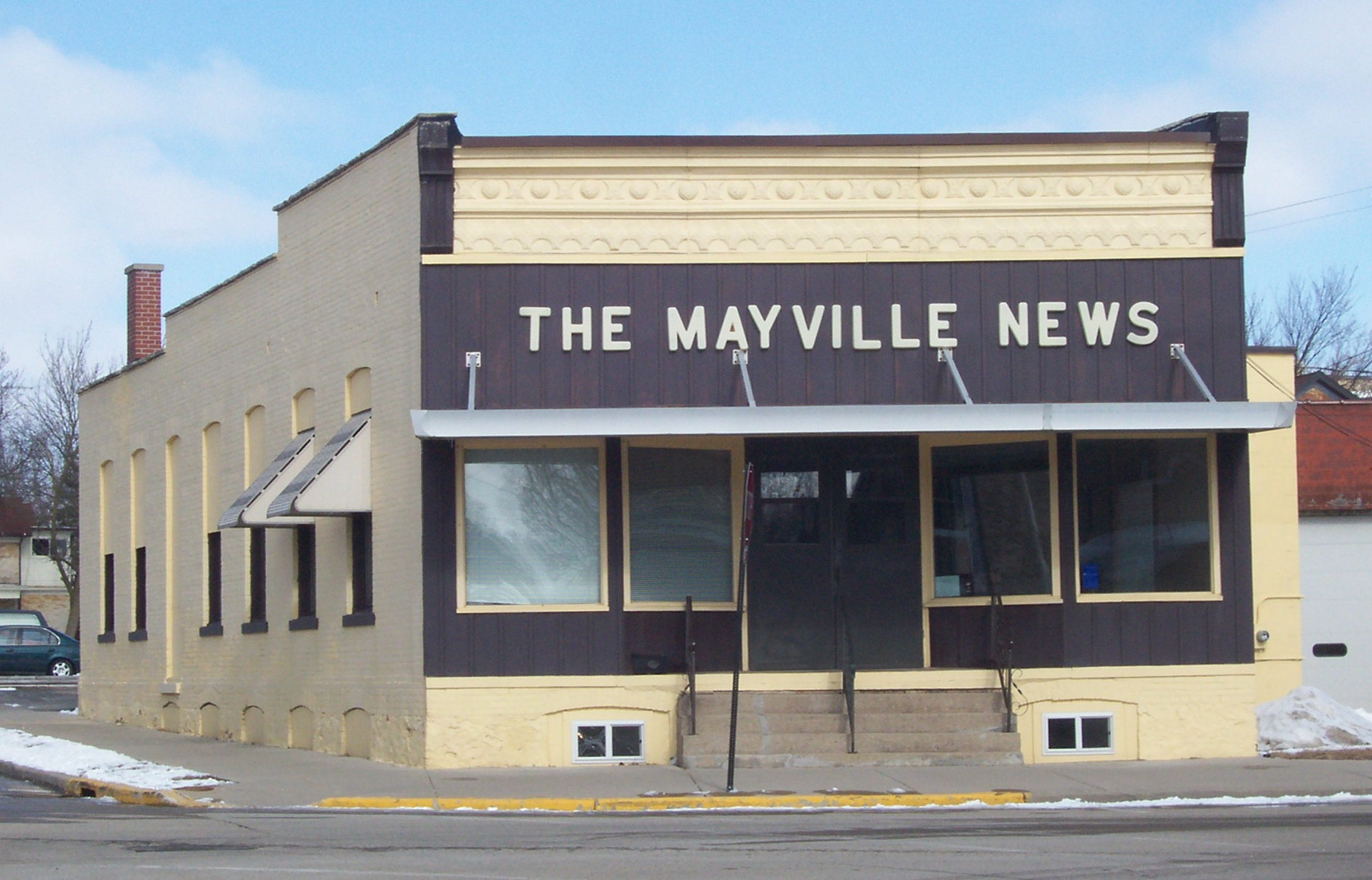
Mayville News building

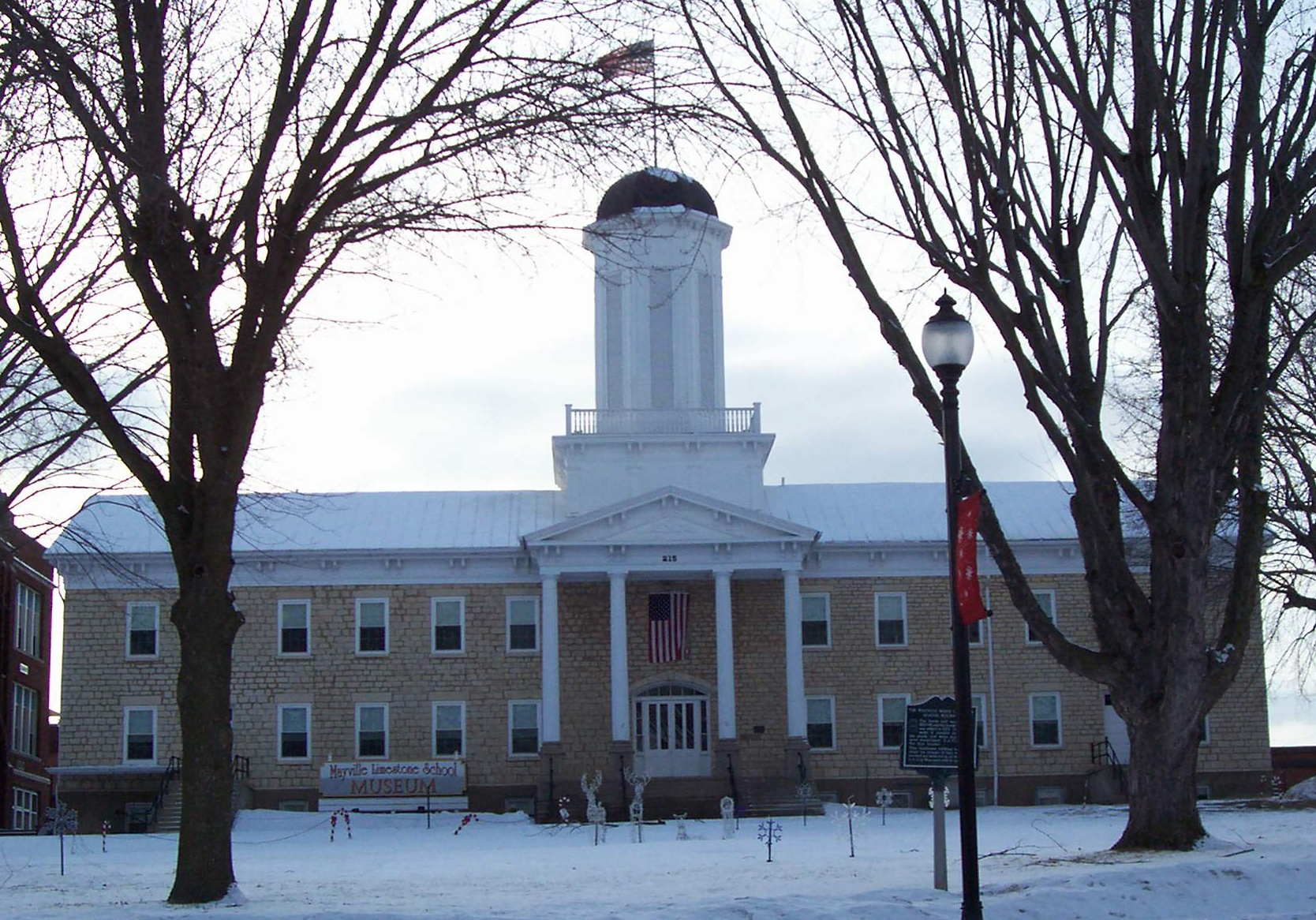
White Limestone School

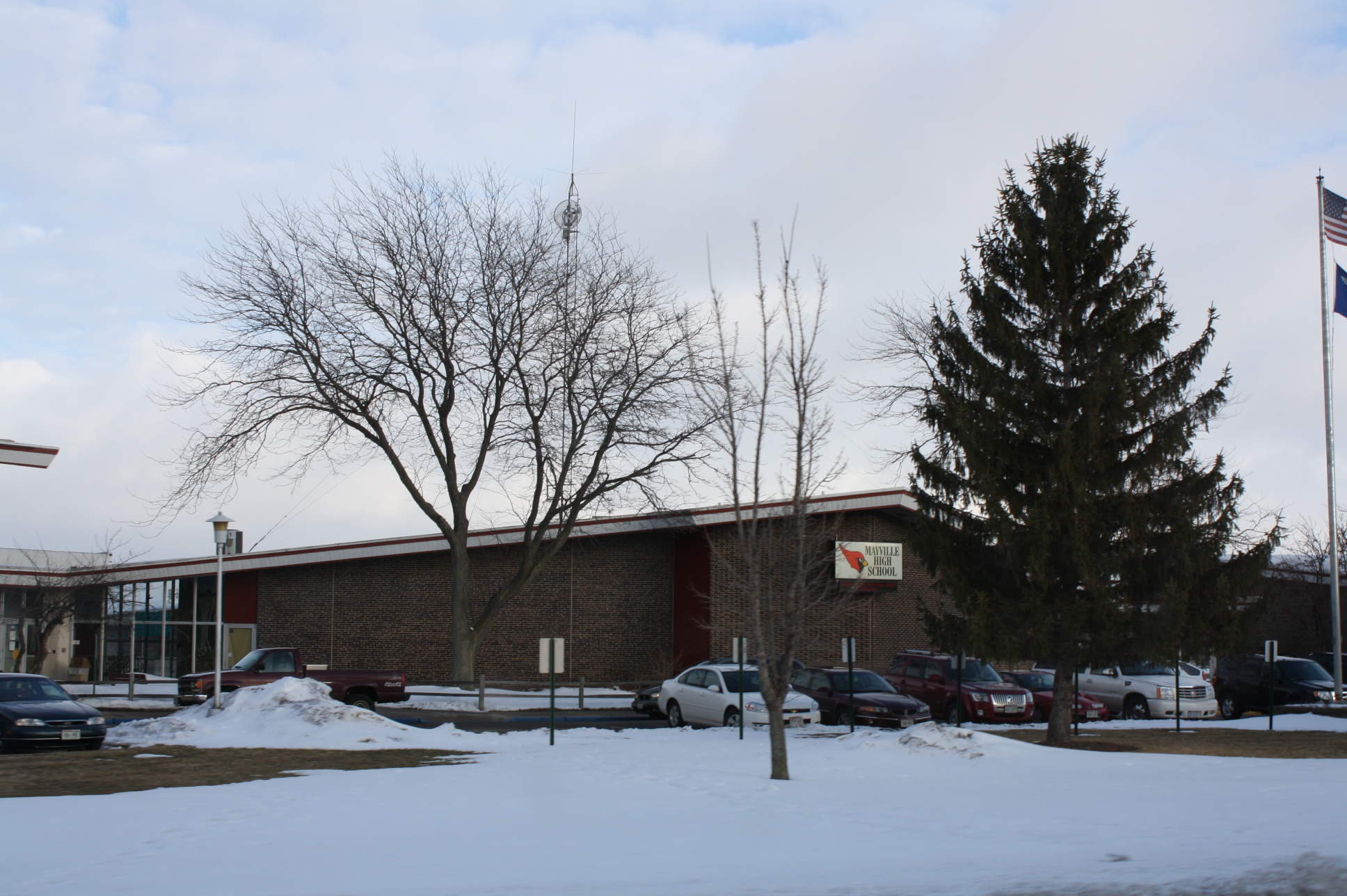
High school

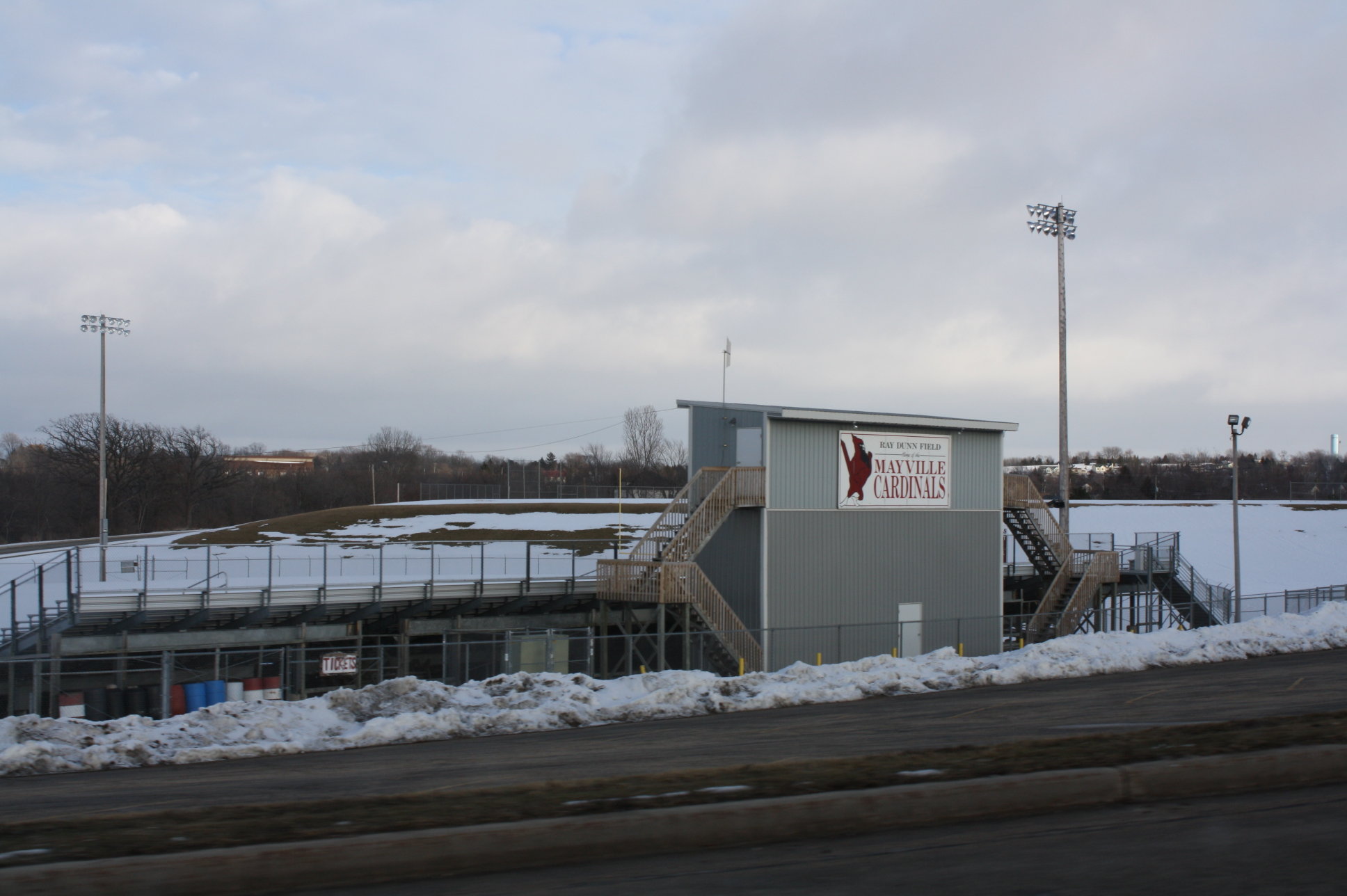
High school field

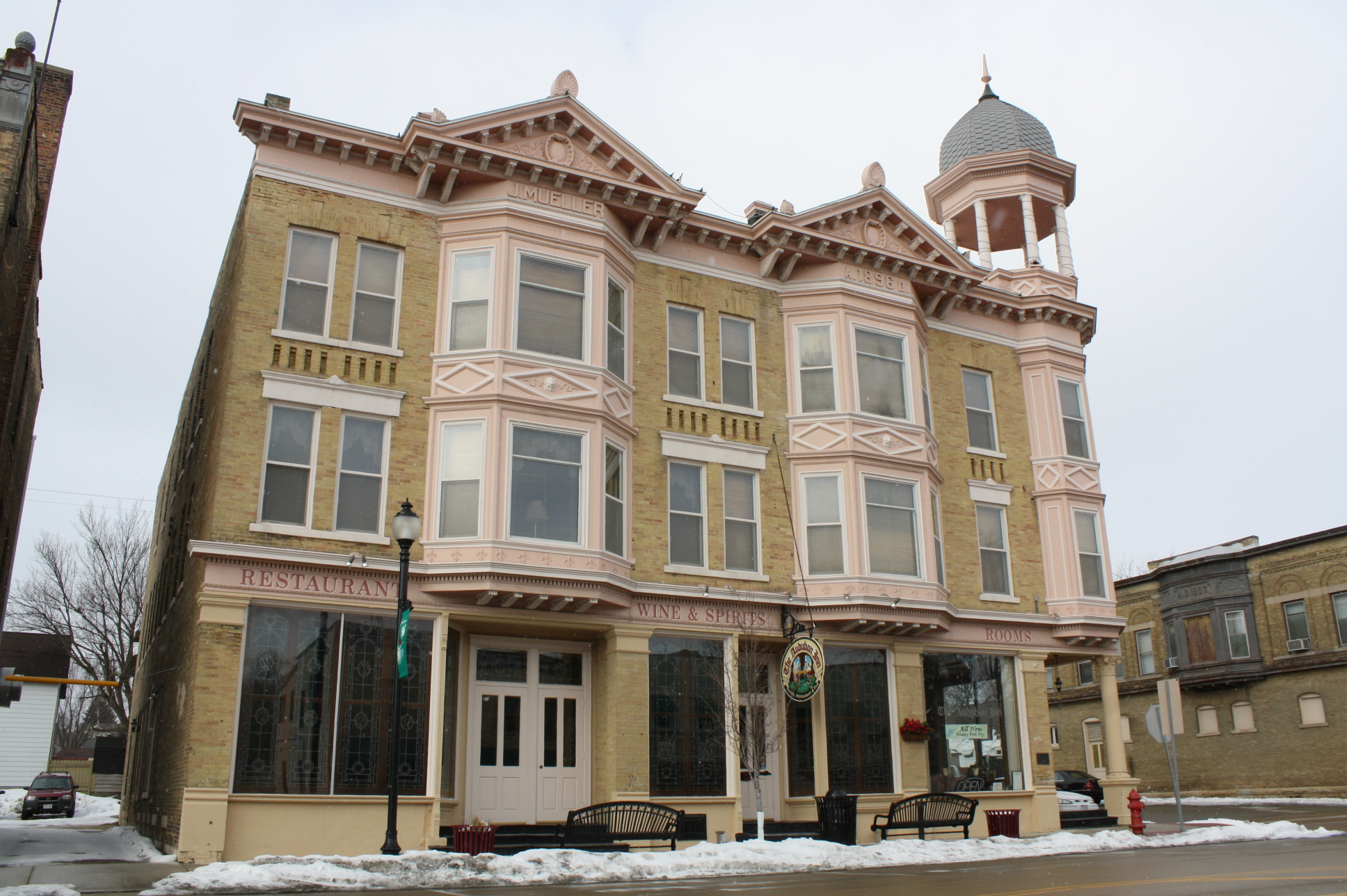
Beaumont Hotel

== See also ==
- Mayville High School
